= Everard (surname) =

Everard is a surname. Notable people with the surname include:

- Charles George Everard (1794–1876), a physician, pioneer farmer and Member of the Legislative Council, in the early days of South Australia.
- Harriett Everard (1844–1882), an English singer and actress
- James Everard (born 1962), a British Army officer
- John Breedon Everard (1844–1923), an English civil engineer and architect
- John Everard (photographer), a British photographer
- John Everard I (fl. 1407–1431), MP for Rochester (UK Parliament constituency) in 1407 (in the 7th Parliament of King Henry IV, 9 Hen. 4 / 9 H. 4) and in 1411 (in the 9th Parliament of King Henry IV, 13 Hen. 4 / 13 H. 4)
- John Everard (? - died c. 1445), MP for Great Bedwyn (in the 9th Parliament of Henry V, 1420, 8 Hen. 5 / 8 H. 5) and Old Sarum (in the 2nd Parliament of Henry VI, 1423, 2 Hen. 6 / 2 H. 6)
- John Everard (Australian politician) (died 1886), an Australian politician in the Victorian Legislative Assembly
- John Everard (footballer) (1881–1952), an Australian rules footballer
- John Everard (preacher) (1584–1641), an English preacher and author
- John Everard (Member of the Parliament of Ireland) (c. 1550–1624), a 17th-century Irish judge and politician; son of Sir Redmond Everard, Member of the Parliament of Ireland for County Tipperary
- John Everard (diplomat), a former British Ambassador to Belarus, Uruguay, and North Korea
- Mathias Everard (?–died 1857), a major-general of Randilestown, County Meath
- Redmond Everard (Member of the Parliament of Ireland) (fl.1585), a 17th century Irish politician and landowner from Fethard, County Tipperary; father of Sir John Everard, Member of the Parliament of Ireland for County Tipperary
- Robert Everard (fl. in the 1st half of 17th century), an English soldier who fought for the Parliamentary cause during the English Civil War
- Sarah Everard (1987-2021), a victim of deadly assault by the policeman who was a latent rapist and murderer
- Thomas Everard (died 1781), the mayor of Williamsburg, Virginia
- Thomas Everard (1560–1633), an English Jesuit
- Wiliam Everard (fl. 14th century), MP for Norwich in the 4th Parliament of Henry IV (5 Hen. 4 / 5 H. 4; 1404, Jan.)
- William Everard (bap. 1602, d. in or after 1651), an early leader of the Diggers.
- William Everard (Victorian politician) (1869–1950), a member of the Victorian Legislative Assembly for the electoral district of Evelyn
- William Everard (South Australian politician) (1819–1889), a member of South Australia's Legislative Assembly and Legislative Council
- William Everard (brewer), the founder of Everards Brewery in Leicester
  - Sir William Lindsay Everard (1891–1949), a brewer and grandson of the first William Everard, politician and philanthropist from Leicestershire, United Kingdom
