= Everard =

Everard is a given name and surname which is the anglicised version of the old Germanic name Eberhard. Notable people with the name include:

== People ==
=== First name ===
- Everard Aloysius Lisle Phillipps (1835–1857), English East India officer awarded the Victoria Cross
- Everard Calthrop (1857–1927), British railway engineer and inventor
- Everard Charles Cotes (1862—1944), British entomologist
- Everard Digby (disambiguation)
- Everard Hambro (1842–1925), British banker
- Everard Home (1756–1832), British physician
- Everard of Calne (fl 1121–1145), Bishop of Norwich
- Everard (bishop of Nyitra) (fl. 1183–1198), Hungarian prelate
- Everard 't Serclaes (c. 1320–1388), Brabantine patriot

=== Last name ===
- Charles George Everard (1794–1876), pioneer farmer and politician in South Australia
- Fiona Everard (born 1998), Irish cross country runner
- Harriett Everard (1844–1882), English singer and actress
- John Everard (disambiguation)
- Mary Everard (1942–2022), English amateur golfer
- Mathias Everard (died 1857), British major-general
- Patrick Everard (Jacobite) (died 1720), Irish Jacobite politician and soldier
- Sarah Everard (1987–2021), British marketing executive who went missing and was found dead
- Susannah Kidder Everard, Lady Everard, (1683–1739) British aristocrat
- Thomas Everard (disambiguation)
- William Everard (disambiguation)

== Fictional characters ==
- Professor Everard, British wizard and former headmaster of Hogwarts School of Witchcraft and Wizardry in the Harry Potter fictional universe.
- Captain Everard, from Henry James' novella In the Cage.
- Everard, an imaginary friend used by English comedian Larry Grayson in his stand-up act.
- Everard Webley, from Aldous Huxley's novel Point Counter Point.

== See also ==
- Everard baronets
- Everard Central, South Australia, a locality
  - Hundred of Everard, South Australia, a cadastral unit
- Papworth Everard, Cambridgeshire, England
