= List of market houses in the Republic of Ireland =

Market houses (sometimes earlier called tholsels) are a notable feature of many Irish towns with varying styles of architecture, size and ornamentation. They are usually located at the centre of the town at which at one stage a market was held. Originally there were one, three, four or even five or more bays on the ground floor which formed a covered arcade to protect traders from the elements and allow access for carts, animals and produce. An upper floor was often used as a court house or ballroom while the cellar or basement was often used as a local gaol. Ornamentation consisted of a cupola, a clock or sometimes a dome or tower. Today most of the market houses in Ireland have been put to use as cultural venues, business premises, town halls or have been left derelict pending development. Many are listed as protected structures while very few have been demolished in recent times due to a newfound architectural, historical and social appreciation.

== Table of market house locations ==
Town	County	Date built	Description	Image and/or link
Abbeyleix	Laois	1836	5 bay, two-storey building until 2005 used as a fire station and library. Renovated as a state of the art library/exhibition centre in the 2000s by de Blacam and Meagher Architects.	
Ardara	Donegal	c. 1840	Heritage centre	
Arvagh	Cavan	1837	Library and council offices	
Athboy	Meath	Pre-1837	Bridal shop	
Athlone	Westmeath	1703	Tholsel demolished 1830	
Athy	Kildare	1745	Heritage centre and library (formerly Athy Town Hall and fire station)	
Aughrim	Wicklow	c. 1860	Restaurant	
Bailieborough	Cavan	1818	Library (previously co-op store and jam factory)	
Balbriggan	Dublin	1811	Furniture store – paid for partly by subscription and partly by the Hamilton family	
Ballaghadereen	Roscommon	Pre-1837		
Ballinagh	Cavan	1821	Disused	
Ballinamore	Leitrim	–	Library	
Ballinasloe	Galway	1832	–	
Ballinrobe	Mayo	1752	5 bay with cupola. District Court House	
Ballitore	Kildare	c. 1780, renovated c. 1840	In ruins	
Ballybay	Monaghan	1848	For sale	
Ballybofey	Donegal	c. 1820	Post office and training centre	
Ballyconnell	Cavan	c. 1838	Disused	
Ballyhaise	Cavan	c. 1740	–	
Ballyjamesduff	Cavan	1813	Restaurant and shop	
Ballymahon	Longford	1819	Sponsored by the Shuldham family. Renovated into new library, one stop shop and community hall 2011	
Ballymote	Sligo	c. 1870	South Co. Sligo community mental health service of the Health Service Executive	
Bandon	Cork	1817	The Shambles, built on the site of an earlier North Market House by the Duke of Devonshire	
Bantry	Cork	–	Offices	
Belturbet	Cavan	c. 1800	Demolished 1927 and replaced with current town hall. Also known as The Workingmen's Hall.	
Birr	Offaly	1845	Formerly a church hall, now a market. Original is shown on Michael Richards map of Birr in 1691.	
Blacklion	Cavan	–	Tourist information centre	
Blessington	Wicklow	c. 1820	Credit union	
Borris-in-Ossory	Laois	1880	Storehouse	
Boyle	Roscommon	1826	The Shambles – still in use by various retailers. An older building at market square was demolished in the 1800s.	
Bray	Wicklow	Original demolished in 1830s. Rebuilt 1881–1883.	Previously Bray Town Hall, now McDonald's fast food outlet	
Buttevant	Cork	18th century	Community centre (formerly court house), community hall	
Cahir	Tipperary	c. 1770	Library and court house	
Cahirciveen	Kerry	19th century ?	Shops and filling station	
Callan	Kilkenny	c. 1825	Town hall	
Cappoquin	Waterford	–	Shop	
Carrick-on-Shannon	Leitrim	1830	formerly Carrick-on-Shannon Courthouse, now a Design and craft centre	
Carrickmacross	Monaghan	1770s	Previously County Fire Service and County Library Service now Lace Gallery Tourist Office and Gift Shop	
Cashel	Tipperary	1866	Formerly town hall, now tourist information centre	
Castleblayney	Monaghan	1826	Derelict with restoration planned	
Castlecomer	Kilkenny	c. 1809	Court house	
Castleisland	Kerry	c. 1745	Department store	
Castlemartyr	Cork	–	Car showroom	
Castlepollard	Westmeath	c. 1815, burned c. 1921, rebuilt c. 1926	Town hall, fire station	
Castlerea	Roscommon	c. 1825	Shop	
Cavan	Cavan	?	Constructed by Lord Farnham. Demolished in 1969 along with the public toilets to make way for new post office building.	
Celbridge	Kildare	17th century	School in 1709, later incorporated in mill complex	
Charleville	Cork	1769	Shops	
Churchtown	Cork	1845	Restored in 2000 as offices and residential	
Clonakilty	Cork	1642	Chinese restaurant	History of Clonakilty Market House
Clonbur	Galway	–	1 bay small square market house	
Clones	Monaghan	1844	Continues to be known as Clones Market House; currently used for the delivery of local services.	
Clonmany	Donegal	c. 1840	Derelict, undergoing restoration	
Clonmel	Tipperary	1673	Formerly a courthouse known as the Main Guard, later a public house; substantially restored; now houses art exhibitions, with scale models of historic Clonmel	
Clonmel	Tipperary	1817	Clonmel Butter Market	
Clonmellon	Westmeath	1835	Market	
Cobh	Cork	1851	Public Library, formerly Cobh Town Hall and courthouse	
Collinstown	Westmeath	1806	Demolished in 1950s, for road straightening. Relocation programmed 2010 T.B.C.	
Collon	Louth	1820	Court house	
Collooney	Sligo	?	Set fire to and destroyed by the IRA during the civil war	
Cootehill	Cavan	1806	Demolished	
Cork	Cork	1864	Cork Butter Market – see Cork Butter Museum	
Cork	Cork	1843	Originally Cork Corn Exchange, destroyed in a fire by the Black and Tans in December 1920, later rebuilt becoming the modern City Hall, Cork today	
Cork	Cork	1739, reconstructed 1843	Located on Corn Market. Eleven bay double height former corn market. Still in use as multiple retail outlets and market as well as public house.	
Cork	Cork	1860	Officially named the Central Markets, they house the more famous English Market.	
Corofin	Clare	c. 1700, rebuilt incorporating part of old building 1876. Described in 1837 as being an old building supported on slanting buttresses and almost disused as the corn was chiefly sent to Ennis.	Commercial	
Delvin	Westmeath	c. 1850	Youth club and credit union	
Donegal	Donegal	c. 1850	–	
Drogheda	Louth	c. 1796	The Corn Exchange, now council offices	
Drogheda	Louth	1769	Mayoralty house, now commercial premises on North Quay	
Drogheda	Louth	1770	Formerly The Tholsel, now council offices	
Drumkeeran	Leitrim	c. 1850	Retail premises	
Dublin 2	Dublin	1816	Formerly, the Corn Exchange, Burgh Quay. The façade of the building still stands as of December 2022.	
Dublin 7	Dublin	1728	Linen Hall, Yarnhall Street – went into terminal decline following the opening of the Belfast Linen Hall in 1783. The build was later used as a barracks and was finally destroyed by a fire during the 1916 rebellion. See Linenhall, Dublin.	
Dublin 7	Dublin	1892	Market hall – Dublin Corporation Wholesale Markets. Closed pending refurbishment 2020.	
Dublin 7	Dublin	1892	Market hall – Dublin fish market, closed 2005 and demolished for new markets surface carpark	
Dublin 8	Dublin	1727	Market Hall – Corn Market House on Thomas Street. (closed c. 1800) Unknown date of demolition.	
Dublin 8	Dublin	1902	Market hall – see Iveagh Markets. Closed since the mid-1990s due to financing issues and ongoing litigation.	
Dublin 8	Dublin	1682–1806	The Tholsel, Dublin – once had a tower with cupola and Ireland's first public clock	
Dundalk	Louth	1751	7 bay building demolished in 1968	
Dunfanaghy	Donegal	1845	Creche	
Dungarvan	Waterford	1690	Arts Centre (formerly a museum)	
Dunlavin	Wicklow	1743 ?	Library, courthouse and art gallery during the annual Dunlavin Arts Festival. Designed by architect Richard Cassels.	
Dunleer	Louth	1820s	Arts, classes, events and civic centre	
Edenderry	Offaly	1826	Formerly ballroom and museum, later a court house now a business centre.	
Edgeworthstown	Longford	–	Supermarket	
Enniscorthy	Wexford	c.1795	Previously a school and a Methodist chapel and later the Urban Council Offices	
Ennistymon	Clare	–	Restaurant	
Eyrecourt	Galway	17th century	Derelict	
Fermoy	Cork	1790	Shops	
Fethard	Tipperary	1610	Original tholsel, town hall	
Finnea	Westmeath	c. 1850	Private house	
Frenchpark	Roscommon	c. 1840	Derelict	
Galway	Galway	c. 1830	–	
Galway	Galway	1639–1822	Galway Tholsel. 6 bay building with cupola on shop street.	
Glenties	Donegal	c. 1840	Community centre	
Gorey	Wexford	1709	Local government administration and tourist information centre	
Graiguenamanagh	Kilkenny	–	Shop	
Granard	Longford	c. 1785	Courthouse and branch library; part still used for farmers' market. Built under the patronage of the McCartney family.	History of Granard Market House History with Photograph
Innishannon	Cork	–	Unused and in disrepair (slates missing)	
Kanturk	Cork	c. 1657	Replaced in 1747	
Kanturk	Cork	1747	(2nd market house) Replaced in 1839	
Kanturk	Cork	1839	(3rd market house) Credit union	
Keadue	Roscommon	c. 1830	–	
Kells	Meath	c. 1800	Commercial outbuilding	
Keenagh	Longford	c. 1820	–	
Kenmare	Kerry	c. 1790	Auctioneer	
Kilbeggan	Westmeath	1828	Unoccupied	
Kilcock	Kildare	c. 1840	–	
Kildare	Kildare	19th century	Bus station, public toilets, museum	
Kilfinane	Limerick	1760	Ruins, only arches and side walls remain	
Kilkenny	Kilkenny	1761	Also known as The Tholsel	
Killarney	Kerry	Pre-1837	Former meat market, then linen market with upstairs used as ballroom	
Killucan	Westmeath	c. 1838	–	
Kilrush	Clare	–	Town hall	
Killeshandra	Cavan	c. 1792	Demolished late 1960s, present site of community resource centre. The original MH commemoration stone is built into the wall of a shop further up the street.	History of Killeshandra
Kiltyclogher	Leitrim	1831	Guest house, pre-school	
Kilworth	Cork	c. 1790	In good condition	
Kingscourt	Cavan	?	Demolished	
Kinsale	Cork	c. 1600	Regional museum (formerly court house)	
Limerick	Limerick	1843	Limerick Potato Market	
Limerick	Limerick	1843	The Milk Market	
Limerick	Limerick	1673, rebuilt 1702, rebuilt 1778	Limerick Tholsel. Later a school; 7 Tuscan columns can still be seen in St Mary's graveyard wall.	
Kinsale	Cork	c. 1770	Former milk market – now restaurant	
Lismore	Waterford	1799	Court house and market house at ground floor (sessions house)	
Listowel	Kerry	Post-1853	–	
Longford	Longford	1710 or earlier	Constructed by the Aungier family. Now in a derelict state located in the Seán Connolly barracks.	
Louisburgh	Mayo	?	Staunton's pharmacy	
Macroom	Cork	19th century ?	Council offices	
Mallow, County Cork	Cork	1840	2 retail units, original was 4 bay 2 storey replacing an earlier market house c. 1800, the remains of which can be seen in the town	
Manorhamilton	Leitrim	1834	Shop, retail outlet	
Midleton	Cork	19th century	Library and court house (formerly town hall)	
Milltown Malbay	Clare	19th century	Pub and restaurant	
Mitchelstown	Cork	1823	Shop	
Monaghan	Monaghan	1792	Arts cenue – see Market House, Monaghan	
Monasterevin	Kildare	c. 1830	–	
Mountrath	Laois	c. 1730	–	
Mountcharles	Donegal	c. 1840	Carved stone on building notes original from 1676	
Mountshannon	Clare	c. 1740	–	
Moville	Donegal	c. 1860	–	
Mullingar	Westmeath	1730, rebuilt in current form 1867	Tourist information centre	
Naas	Kildare	1813	Private house	
Navan	Meath	1632, demolished c. 1800	Tholsel court with stone inscription – "Edmund Manninge was overseer of this work in the year of Our Lord 1632. On whose soul the Lord have mercy"	
Nenagh	Tipperary	1812	Adult education centre for North Tipperary Vocational Education Committee and restaurant/take away (part)	
Newbliss	Monaghan	1830	–	
Newcastle West	Limerick	1873	–	
Newmarket	Cork	1810	Community use	
Newtownmountkennedy	Wicklow	Pre-1798	Used as a school in 1837	
New Ross	Wexford	1749, rebuilt 1806–1810	Tholsel, court house, town hall from 1840	
Oldcastle	Meath	1742	Originally 3 bay and 3 storeys high, now much altered 2 storey commercial premises	
Pettigo	Donegal	1836	–	–
Piltown	Kilkenny	1830s	–	Photograph of Piltown Market House
Portarlington	Laois	c. 1800	Referred to as a tholsel by Samuel Lewis. Now petrol station and garage.	
Portlaoise	Laois	?		
Rockcorry	Monaghan	1805	Filling station	
Roscommon	Roscommon	1762 et seq.	An earlier market house collapsed 2 March 1719 when the courtroom above was overcrowded with 200 prisoners when the court was in session. The replacement building was built by John Ensor, architect 1762. Subsequently served as RC church. The Bank of Ireland branch.	
Roscrea	Tipperary	1886 replacing earlier larger Market House	Demolished in the 1920s	
Scarriff	Clare	1855	Weigh house	
Shercock	Cavan	1825	Shops	
Sixmilebridge	Clare	Pre-1831	–	–
Stradbally	Laois	1899	Market	
Strokestown	Roscommon	c. 1830	Shop, retail outlet	
Tallow	Waterford	N/A	Proposed but not executed	
Templemore	Tipperary	1816	Now used as Templemore Town Hall	
Thurles	Tipperary	N/A – never constructed		
Timoleague	Cork	1700, rebuilt ?	Vacant	
Tinahely	Wicklow	c. 1820	Branch library	
Tralee	Kerry	1847	Chinese restaurant	
Trim	Meath	c. 1850	Town hall	
Tulla	Clare	c. 1833	Branch library	
Tullamore	Offaly	1789	Building society	
Slane	Meath	1800	–	
Virginia	Cavan	c. 1815	Courthouse and county council offices	
Waterford	Waterford	?	Butter market located on the quay. Now demolished.	
Westport	Mayo	1767	Storehouse	
Wexford	Wexford	1776	Previously corn market house and now Wexford Arts Centre (formerly town hall)	
Youghal	Cork	–	Heritage centre	

== See also ==
- Architecture of Ireland
- Irish Architectural Archive
- List of towns and villages in Ireland
- Market houses in Northern Ireland
- Tholsel
- Market hall
- Weigh house
