= John Everard =

John Everard may refer to:

- John Breedon Everard (1844–1923), English civil engineer and architect
- John Everard (photographer), British photographer
- John Everard I (fl. 1407–1431), MP for Rochester in 1407
- John Everard (died 1445), MP for Great Bedwyn and Old Sarum
- John Everard (Australian politician) (died 1886), Australian politician in the Victorian Legislative Assembly
- John Everard (footballer) (1881–1952), Australian rules footballer
- John Everard (preacher) (1584–1641), English preacher and author
- John Everard (MP, died 1624) (c. 1550–1624), Irish judge and politician
- John Everard (diplomat), former British ambassador to Belarus, Uruguay, and North Korea
