= List of Irish MPs 1585–1586 =

This is a list of members of the Irish House of Commons between 1585 and 1586.

Name	Constituency	Religion	Notes
Francis Anyas	Youghal		
Richmond Archbold	Cross Tipperary		
Sir Richard Aylward	County Waterford	Catholic	Of Faithlegg
Sir Nicholas Bagenal	County Down	Protestant	The Newry
Nicholas Ball	Dublin City	Catholic	Alderman of Dublin
Robert Barnewall	Ardee		
John Barnewall	Drogheda		Of Brimore/Bremore, Dublin
Richard Barnewall	County Meath		
Edward Berkeley	County Antrim	Protestant	
Sir Richard Bingham	County Roscommon	Protestant	
Gerard Blancheville	County Kilkenny		
Sir George Bourchier	King's County	Protestant	
Richard Bourke	County Limerick		
Edward Brennan	Callan		
Sir Valentine Browne	County Sligo	Protestant	
Henry Burnell	County Dublin	Catholic	Of Castleknock
James Butler	County Tipperary		
Boetius Clancy	County Clare	Protestant	Of Knockfine
Robert Codd	County Wexford		
William Cogan	County Cork		His daughter married John de Courcy, 18th Baron Kingsale
James Collen	Youghal		
Gerald Comerford	Callan	Protestant	
Thomas Coppinger	Youghal		
Redmond Everard	County Tipperary	Catholic	
Geoffrey Fenton	County Carlow	Protestant	Of Dublin - Principal Secretary of State
John Fitzedmond	County Cork		Of Cloyne
John Fitzgerald	County Kerry		
Matthew Fitzhenry	County Wexford		
Thomas Fitzmaurice	County Kildare		
James Galwey	Kinsale		Of Kinsale
Roger Gerlone	County Louth		
Robert Harpoll	Queen's County		
Thomas Le Straunge	County Galway		
Sir Hugh Magennis	County Down	Catholic	Of Rathfriland
John Meade	Cork City		
William More	County Louth		
John Netterville	County Meath	Catholic	
Richard Netterville	County Dublin	Catholic	Of Corballis/Corballies, Dublin
Sir John Norreys	County Cork	Protestant	Lord President of Munster
Thomas Norris	County Limerick	Protestant	
Edward Nugent of Disert	County Westmeath		
Edward Nugent of Morton	County Westmeath	Catholic	
Peter Nugent	Drogheda		
Sir Turlough O'Brien	County Clare	Catholic	Of Inishdyman - Grandson of Connor O'Brien, King of Thomond
Faghna or Faghtna O'Farrell	County Longford	Catholic	O'Farrell Boy, Lord of South Annaly
William O'Farrell	County Longford	Catholic	O'Farrell Bane, Lord of North Annaly
Shane McBrien O'Neill	County Antrim		Of Shane's Castle
Philip O'Reilly	County Cavan	Catholic	Of Cavan - Claimant to the Lordship of East Breifne
Edmund O'Reilly	County Cavan	Catholic	Claimant to the Lordship of East Breifne
Edmund Prendergast	Cross Tipperary		Of Newcastle, County Tipperary
Philip Roche	Kinsale		Of Kinsale
Robert Rothe	County Kilkenny		
Sir Warham St Leger	Queen's County	Protestant	
Thomas Sarsfield	Cork City		
Francis Shane	County Galway		
James Sherlock	County Waterford		Of Grace Dieu, about a mile to the west of Waterford
Thomas Spring	County Kerry		Gentleman, son of Katherine ne Dermodo
William Sutton	County Kildare		
George Taylor	Dublin City		Of Dublin
Sir Henry Wallop	County Carlow	Protestant	Of Dublin
Nicholas Walsh	Waterford City	Protestant	Speaker
Henry Waring	King's County		
Edward Waterhouse	Carrickfergus	Protestant	

The following present-day counties were not represented: County Armagh, County Donegal, County Fermanagh, County Leitrim, County Londonderry, County Monaghan and County Tyrone.
