= Cross Tipperary =

Cross Tipperary, formally the County of the Cross of Tipperary, was an Irish county comprising those lands within County Tipperary which were excluded from the "County of the Liberty of Tipperary", the county palatine under the jurisdiction of the Earl of Ormond. Cross Tipperary existed from the granting of the liberty in 1328 until 1637, and was explicitly abolished along with the palatine jurisdiction in 1715.

== Creation ==
After the Norman invasion of Ireland, only the most securely controlled areas on the east and south coast were shired into "royal counties", with sheriffs answerable to the chief governor based in Dublin. Areas impractical of full control were granted to magnates as "liberties" or "palatine counties", with seneschals appointed by the local overlord. The "crosslands" owned by the church (whether the diocese or a religious order) were exempted from each such grant and remained under royal jurisdiction. Tipperary was a royal county in the 13th century, but the English Lordship of Ireland's control loosened after Edward Bruce's campaign of 1315–18. Control of Tipperary was tenuous and so the liberty was granted to James Butler, 1st Earl of Ormond in 1328. The excluded crosslands became a separate county. They included the town of Cashel, seat of the Archbishop of Cashel, and scattered other crosslands.

Each of the other liberties was either forfeited or merged in the Crown, such that its territory was combined with the corresponding County of the Cross and established as a single royal county. Thus, eventually, only Cross Tipperary remained as an anomaly.

== Crosslands ==
Only those lands in church ownership at the time of the 1328 grant were part of the county of the cross; lands acquired by the church subsequently were not added to it, and lands ceded by the church remained part of it. This was most notable after the Dissolution of the monasteries instigated by Henry VIII. The Irish Manuscripts Commission's report on Down Survey of the 1650s states, 'To establish the identity "of the lands of Abbeys and houses of religion within the precincts of Cross Tipperary" would be a considerable undertaking'. A 1600 list of freeholders in Cross Tipperary included holders of land in the baronies of Middle Third, Clanwilliam, Slievardagh, and Eliogarty, and the town of Clonmel. A county jury of Cross Tipperary in 1606 had members from Fethard, Ballyclerahan, Lattin, and elsewhere. Heffernan's partial list of crossland locations names Tipperary town, Cahir, Emly, Holy Cross Abbey, Athassel, Inislounaght, Moorestown Kirk, Cregstown, and Mollough.

== Dough Arra ==
In 1606, Dough Arra was the unshired túath of the O'Brien-Arra sept, bounded by counties Clare, Limerick, Tipperary, and Cross Tipperary. King James I authorised the annexation of Dough Arra to Cross Tipperary because the latter, "albeit it be one of the most ancient Counties in the Kingdom, was of a very small Extent & Circuit, so as now it did scarce deserve the Name of a County, by reason of sundry Incroachments made thereupon". After a commission to establish the boundaries of Dough Arra, Sir Nicholas Walsh, the Chief Justice of the Irish Common Pleas, effected its annexation at the Cross Tipperary assizes in Cashel in 1606. The new barony of Dough Arra was later merged with part of Uaithne (Owney) to form the modern barony of Owney and Arra.

== Parliamentary representation ==
Cross Tipperary was a separate county constituency from County Tipperary in the Irish House of Commons, although not every parliament returned members for both constituencies. The earliest record of members from Cross Tipperary dates from 1374.

MPs for Cross Tipperary
Parliament	MPs	Residence
1585	Richard Archbold	
1585	Edmund Prendergast	Newcastle
1613	Edmund Butler	"Cloghowly" (Clocully, north of Newcastle)
1613	Thomas Laffan	"Cregstowne" (Graystown)
1634	Sir Thomas Geogh	Clonmel
1634	Geffrey Mockler	"Dracoasland" (probably Acarandraky, aka Drake's Acre, parish of Moorestownkirk in Middle Third)

Hugh Kearney suggests that Cross Tipperary's lack of representation in the 1639 parliament was a consequence of Thomas Wentworth's opposition to Catholic MPs.

== Extinction ==
In 1621, Walter Butler, 11th Earl of Ormond forfeited the liberty by Quo Warranto. On 6 July 1637, letters patent were issued by which:

the Counties of Tipperary & Crosse Tipperary were really & actually united, annexed, appropriated incorporated, & consolidated together, to be one entire County, & to be for ever nominated, called & known by the Name of the County of Tipperary only, & to have but one High Sheriff to be appointed & chosen as of other Counties in Ireland, with Coroners, Justices of the Peace & Gaol Delivery & other officers & Ministers whatsoever according as in other Counties had been or was used & accustomed.

In 1662, after the Restoration, James Butler, 1st Duke of Ormonde was again granted palatine jurisdiction, this time including all the lands formerly in Cross Tipperary as well as those of the earlier grant. The letters patent making the grant stated that upon the 1621 seizure "the barony of Owny and Arra and divers other towns, villages, and townlands, scattered through the various baronies of the County Tipperary, and called the County of the Cross of Tipperary, were annexed to the County of Tipperary, and made part and parcel of the said County". This was despite the fact that Cross Tipperary returned MPs to the 1634 parliament.

James Butler, 2nd Duke of Ormonde took the losing Jacobite side in the 1715 rising and was attainted by a 1715 Act of the Irish Parliament. The act's long title begins "An Act for extinguishing the Regalities and Liberties of the County of Tipperary, and Cross Tipperary, commonly called the County Palatine of Tipperary". Section 2 stated:

And it is hereby enacted and declared, That whatsoever has been denominated or called Tipperary, or Cross Tipperary, shall henceforth be and remain one county for ever, under the name of the county of Tipperary.
