= Main Guard (Clonmel) =

The Main Guard
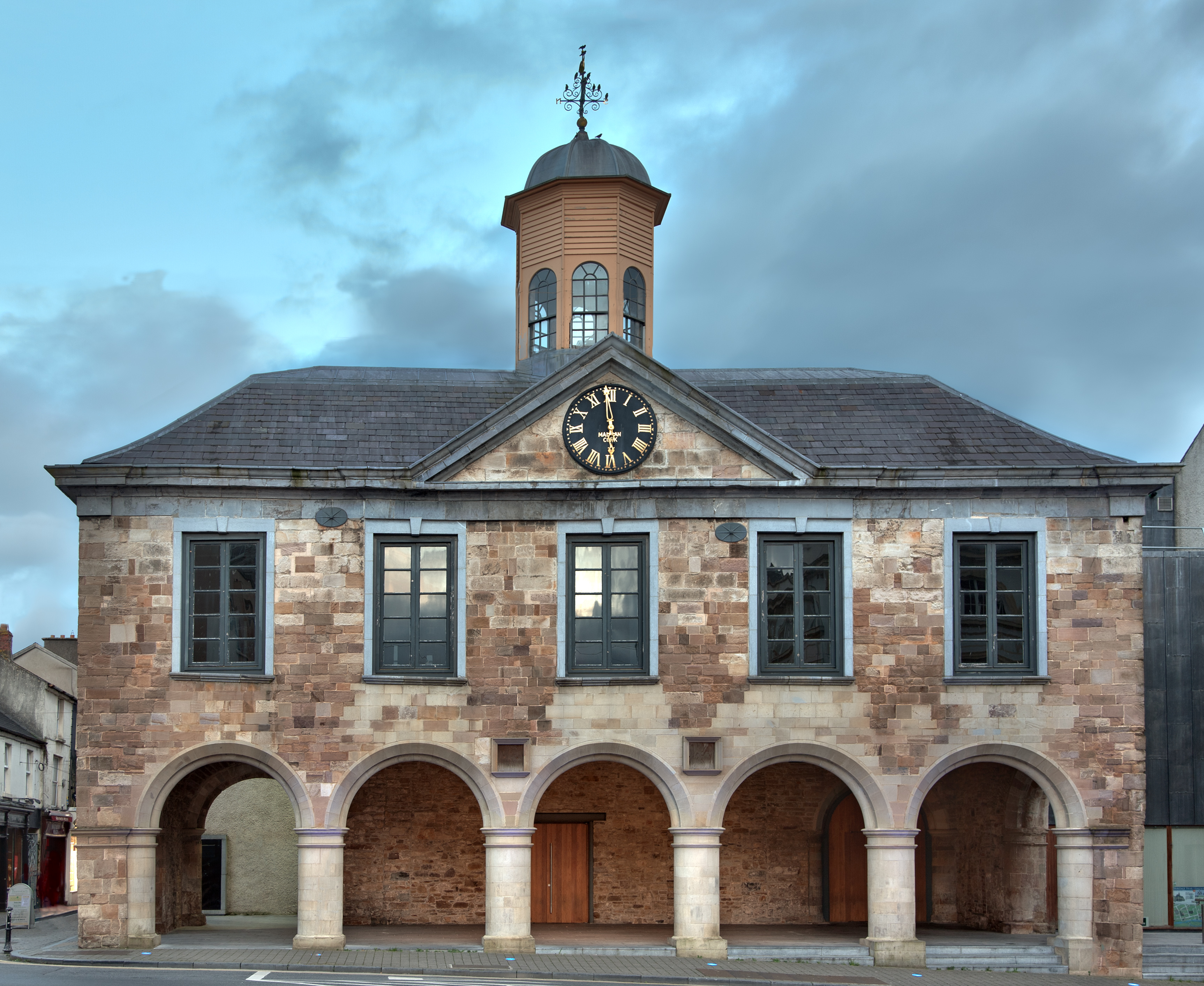
- Front façade

- Location within Ireland

General information
- Type: courthouse
- Architectural style: Palladian
- Location: 57 Gladstone Street, Clonmel, Ireland
- Coordinates: 52.353149°N 7.701415°W
- Elevation: 24 m (79 ft)
- Construction started: 1674
- Owner: Office of Public Works

Technical details
- Material: sandstone, limestone, steel, lead, timber, slate
- Floor count: 2

Design and construction
- Designations

National monument of Ireland
- Official name: Clonmel Mainguard Courthouse
- Reference no.: 667

The Main Guard is a former courthouse located in Clonmel, Ireland. It is a protected structure and designated as a National Monument.

== Location ==
The Main Guard is located in the centre of Clonmel, north of the River Suir.

== History ==
It was here that the "main guard" of the troops for Clonmel were once stationed. During the Siege of Clonmel (1650), the old Manor Court was destroyed, and after the restoration of the 1st Duke of Ormonde's (1610–88) palatinate rights in 1662, he ordered the building of a new courthouse. Some of the stone was taken from Inislounaght Abbey (closed in 1540). It was completed in 1674: a courthouse for the Palatinate of County Tipperary. Also in the courthouse were private apartments, a dining room and drawing room. These were used to entertain King James II in Clonmel in 1689. The building was also used as a "tholsel", for gathering tolls. Some of the design was copied from works of Sir Christopher Wren.

In 1715, the Palatinate jurisdiction was extinguished. After that, the Clonmel Assizes was held in the building, and it was there that Father Nicholas Sheehy, the anti-Penal Laws agitator, was tried in 1766. He was hanged, drawn and quartered.

In about 1810, the ground floor, a loggia of open arches, was converted into shops, a basement excavated and additional floors inserted. In the 1990s the Office of Public Works began to restore its original form and the open arcade of sandstone columns is once again a feature of the streetscape.

== Architecture ==
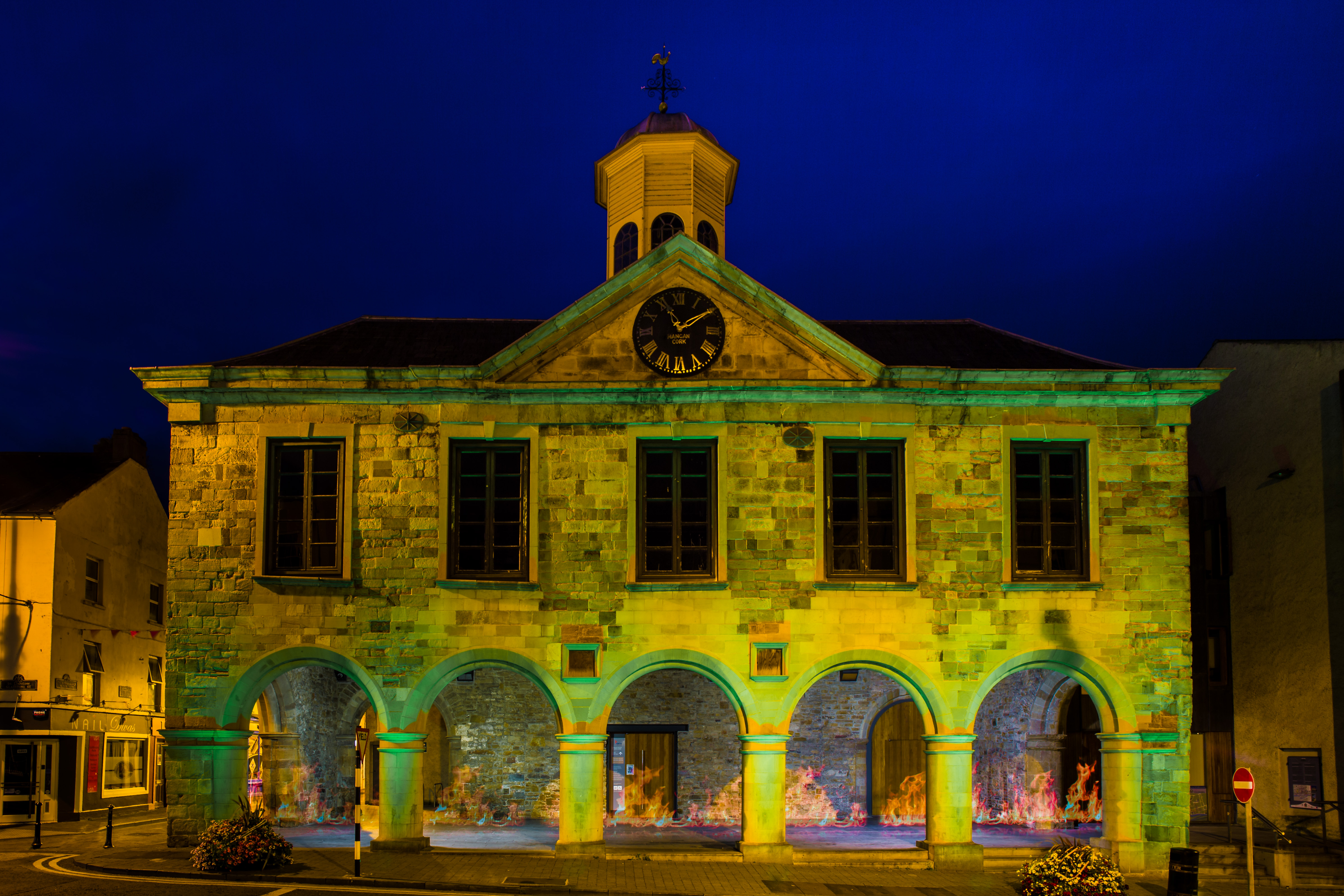
The Main Guard at night, 2015

The Main Guard is a formerly detached five-bay two-storey courthouse and market house, with arcaded ground floor. It incorporates classical elements, such as the pediment. A major programme of restoration works, carried out to a design by Punch Consulting, commenced in 2004.
