= Richard Everard =

Richard Everard may refer to:

- Sir Richard Everard, 1st Baronet, of Ballyboy (died c. 1660) of the Everard baronets
- Sir Richard Everard, 1st Baronet, of Much Waltham (died c.1680)
- Sir Richard Everard, 2nd Baronet (c. 1625–1694), member of parliament for Westminster
- Sir Richard Everard, 4th Baronet (c. 1683–1733), proprietary governor of North Carolina
- Sir Richard Everard, 5th Baronet (died 1742) of the Everard baronets
