= Thomas Everard =

Thomas Everard may refer to:

- Thomas Everard (mayor) (died 1781), mayor of Williamsburg, Virginia
- Thomas Everard (Jesuit) (1560–1633), English Jesuit
- Thomas-Everard family, a family of British farmers

== See also ==
- Everard (surname)
