= Thomas Everett (disambiguation) =

Thomas Everett (born 1964) is a former American football safety.

Thomas Everett may also refer to:

- Tom Everett (born 1948), American actor
- Thomas Everard (Jesuit) or Everett (1560–1633), English Jesuit
- Thomas Wright Everett (1823–1895), British governor of Maui
