= Everard baronets of Ballyboy (1622) =

Baronetcy in the Baronetage of Ireland

Escutcheon of the Everard baronets of Ballyboy

The Everard baronetcy, of Ballyboy in the County of Tipperary, was created in the Baronetage of Ireland on 30 April 1622 for Richard Everard of Fethard. He was from a Catholic family, the second son of Sir John Everard (died 1624). He was later a member of Confederate Ireland, and was condemned to death by the Cromwellian forces in 1651. He was reprieved, and died in prison about 10 years later.

The 3rd baronet was killed at the Battle of Aughrim in 1691, fighting on the losing side. His estates were forfeited, but his son later recovered them. The 4th baronet was created Viscount Everard in the Jacobite Peerage in 1723. The titles became extinct on his death in exile in France c. 1740, without issue.

== Everard baronets, of Ballyboy (1622) ==
- Sir Richard Everard, 1st Baronet (died c.1660)
- Sir Redmond Everard, 2nd Baronet (died 1687)
- Sir John Everard, 3rd Baronet (died 1691)
- Sir Redmond Everard, 4th Baronet (died c.1742)
