= Nicholas Sheehy =

Irish priest

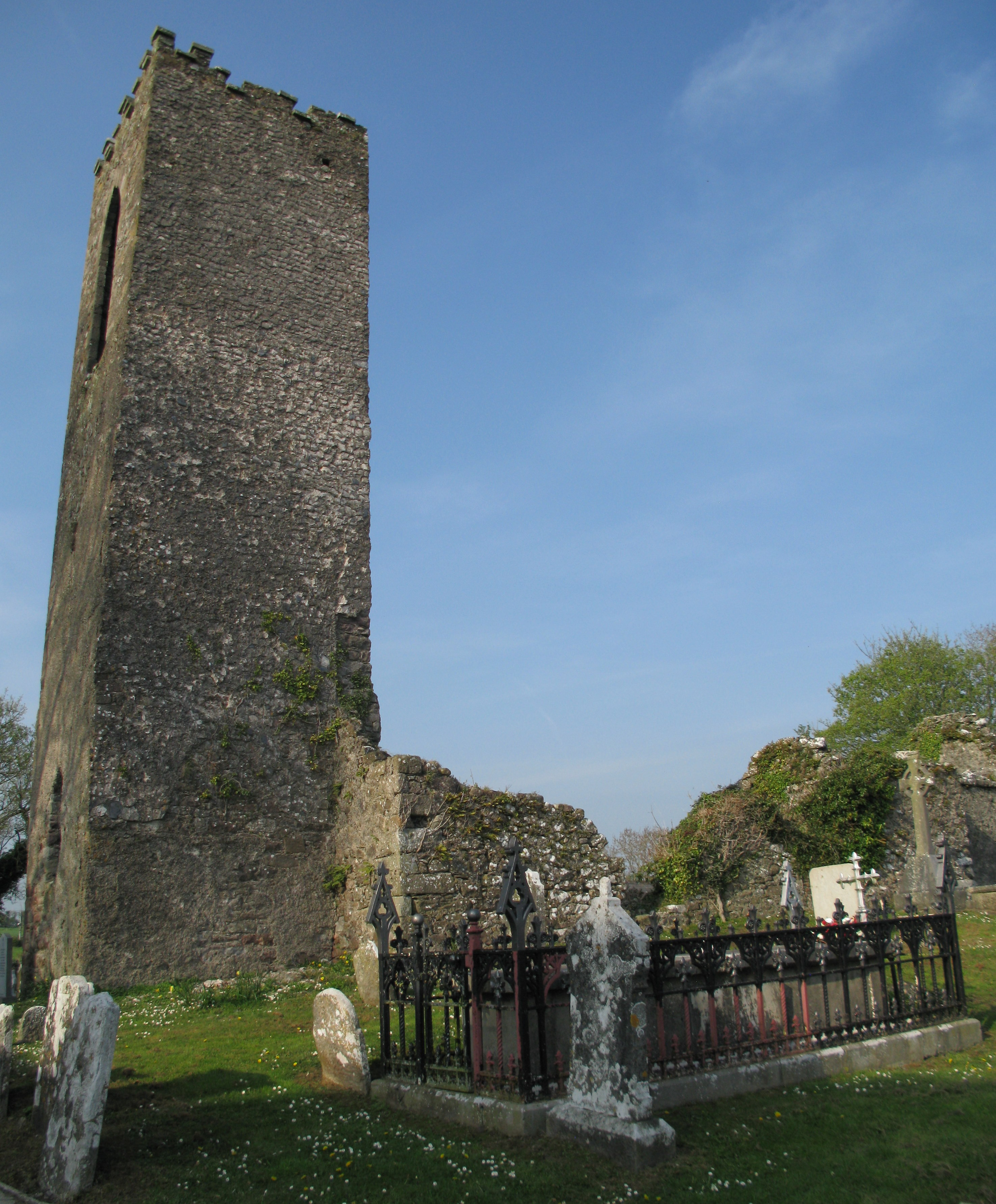
Fr. Sheehy's grave at Shanrahan cemetery, near Clogheen

Father Nicholas Sheehy (1728–1766) was an 18th-century Irish Roman Catholic priest who was executed on the charge of being an accessory to murder. Father Sheehy was a prominent and vocal opponent of the Penal Laws, which subjected the whole Catholic Church in Ireland to religious persecution, and as a vocal activist for Catholic Emancipation. His conviction was widely regarded as a judicial murder and was cited long afterwards as Irish jargon for a miscarriage of justice. Fr. Nicholas Sheehy is currently regarded as one of the Irish Catholic Martyrs.

== Background ==
During this time, famine caused much suffering and death in Ireland. Adding to the social unrest were very real fears that the French House of Bourbon would invade the British Isles. Part of this concern stemmed from the emigration of Irish soldiers who had left for exile in France after the Treaty of Limerick, which is known as the Flight of the Wild Geese. The concern was that these Irish would lobby the French monarch to support the Catholics in Ireland. This led to continuing religious persecution of the Catholic Church in Ireland and its priests.

== Family ==
Nicholas Sheehy was born in Fethard, Ireland, near Clonmel and grew up in a house near Newcastle on the Tipperary and Waterford border. His father was Francis, son of John of Drumcollogher.

Nicholas Sheehy had a sister, Mrs Green. Nicholas had a cousin (Edmund Buck), who was hanged in 1775 at Clogheen on the same charges.

== Education, career and opposition to Penal Laws ==
Nicholas Sheehy was possibly educated in France. His training for the priesthood was at the Irish College at Salamanca. and was ordained in 1750. Following a period as curate at Newcastle, County Tipperary, he became the parish priest for Shanrahan, Ballysheehan, and Templetenny, County Tipperary. Sheehy often spoke out against the Penal Laws, the eviction of poor tenants by Anglo-Irish landlords, the elimination of common land by enclosure, and compulsory tithes even by impoverished Catholics to support the Established Protestant Church of Ireland's clergy. To anyone who would not or could not pay, the tithes or other collateral were often taken by the police or militia and given to the local Protestant minister.

Between 1735 and 1760 there was an increase in land used for grazing and beef cattle, in part because pasture land was exempt from tithes. The landlords, having let their lands far above their value, on condition of allowing the tenants the use of certain commons, now enclosed the commons, but did not lower the rent. Similarly to the simultaneous Highland Clearances in Scotland, while labourers and small tenant farmers were evicted en masse, Anglo-Irish landlords replaced them with more profitable herds of cattle. In response, the Whiteboys developed, as a secret society among the peasantry. Initially, their activities were limited to specific grievances and the tactics used non-violent, such as knocking down fences and the levelling of ditches constructed for the enclosure of common grazing land, but as their numbers increased and the State's response escalated, so did the violence and vigilantism, including well documented cases of the torture and assassination of those who violated the code of silence. Similarly to the Land War of the late 19th century, however, the Whiteboys' actions were not specifically political and not directed against the government, but against actions that were widely seen as abuses of power by the Anglo-Irish landlords. Often, members of multiple different religious denominations took part. Fr. Sheehy raised money to hire defence lawyers for those accused of rioting.

== Accusations and trials ==
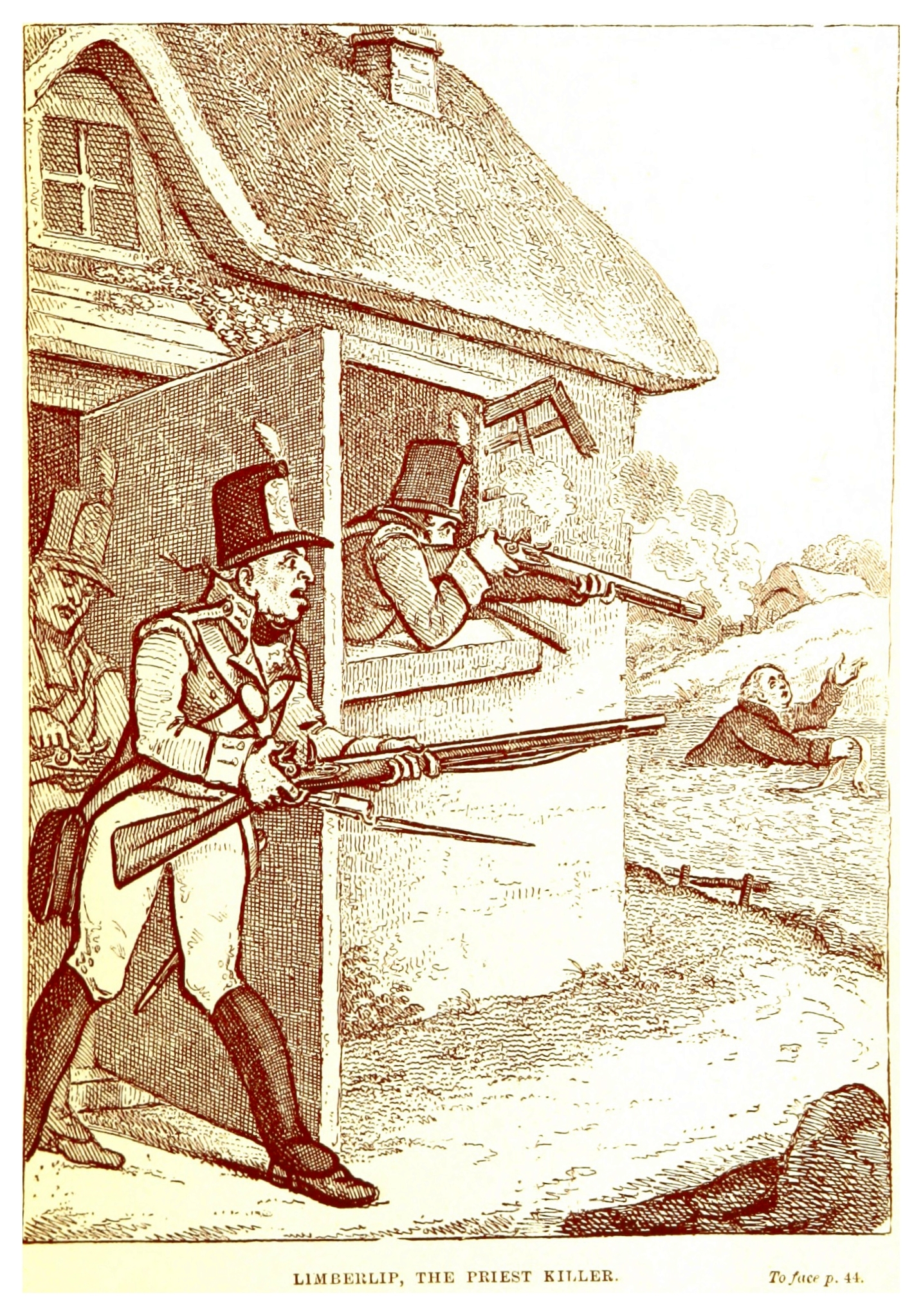
On 2 April 1761 a force of 50 militia men and 40 soldiers set out for Tallow ...

=== First trial (sedition) ===
Sheehy's beliefs led him into conflict with the local Protestant Ascendancy around Clonmel. He was arrested for sedition for his supposed involvement in the Whiteboys' destruction of a wall intended to enclose commonly held land near Clogheen. After a trial in Dublin he was acquitted.

=== Second trial (high treason) ===
Following his acquittal, Sheehy was accused of involvement in the disappearance or murder of a local informer, John Bridge. Fr. Sheehy went into hiding. In 1764, the government issued a Proclamation and offered £300 reward for the capture of Sheehy. Sheehy wrote to Thomas Waite, Under-Secretary for Ireland, offering to surrender if he would be tried in Dublin. The offer was accepted and his trial took place on 10 February 1766, when he was acquitted of High Treason. Immediately after his acquittal, Fr. Sheehy was charged with the murder of John Bridges, despite the absence of a corpus delicti.

=== Third trial (accessory to murder) and death sentence ===
On 12 March 1766, Sheehy was tried at Clonmel Main Guard for being an accessory in the murder of John Bridge. The judge Richard Clayton had the reputation of an honest and humane man, but he had arrived in Ireland only the previous year and seems to have been quite unaware of the political background to the trial.

Many of the witnesses who had previously testified against Sheehy also testified in this trial, in addition to Mrs. Mary Brady (Moll Dunlea), an "abandoned character". The evidence was widely considered as fabricated by local Anglo-Irish landowners and the Church of Ireland Vicar of Clogheen, County Tipperary.

Evidence was presented in favour of Sheehy, that he was "a respectable man and a man of property" by a Mr Keating, who said that Father Sheehy was in his house at the time of the murder. Mr Keating's testimony was dismissed in court by a Protestant clergyman (Mr Hewitson), who declared Keating was unreliable. Mr Keating was then arrested and sent to Kilkenny Gaol based on Mr Hewitson's allegations to frustrate his giving evidence. Although the judge was later much criticised for his conduct of the trial, it has been argued that his summing up speech was actually favourable to the accused and advising the jury to return with an acquittal.

Instead, Sheehy was convicted and sentenced to be hanged, drawn and quartered. He asserted his innocence before his death of all the charges made against him. He said in his final speech, after being sentenced to death, that he was being put to death for a crime which had never been committed; the murder victim (John Bridge) was alleged to be in Cork after the date of the "crime" and it was thought that it was arranged that Bridges emigrated to the Newfoundland Colony.

Fr. Sheehy's defence attorney, on hearing the verdict and sentence of death, addressed the court, "If there is any justice in heaven, you will die roaring."

== Execution ==
Sheehy was hanged at Clonmel on 15 March 1766. Others accused were also convicted for the murder of John Bridge and executed (3 May 1766), including Edmond Sheehy, cousin of the priest, and Ned Meehan, a prominent Catholic farmer who refused to bear witness against Sheehy when offered his liberty in prison. Fr. Sheehy was hanged on a scaffold in Clonmel opposite St. Peters and Paul's Church, where there is a plaque to commemorate his death. His head was posthumously severed and stuck on a spike over Clonmel Gaol, as a warning against agrarian violence and remained above the porch at Clonmel jail for ten years.

His sister, Catherine Sheehy Burke (whose husband Richard was cousin to Edmund Burke), eventually obtained her brother's body and had him buried in the graveyard at Shanrahan.

== Legacy ==
To this day, Father Sheehy is regarded as one of the Irish Catholic Martyrs. In the late 19th century and early 20th century, there was an effort to have him canonised, which reportedly was dropped after the records collected for his cause were destroyed in a fire.

His trial and execution inflamed and polarised Irish nationalist opinion, and had a great effect on the efforts of his cousin, Edmund Burke, to push for Catholic Emancipation.

Pilgrims still visit his grave at Shanrahan cemetery near Clogheen to take clay, because it is traditionally believed to have healing powers. It is claimed that out of respect, the birds didn't peck his head during the ten years it was displayed on the spike.
