= Fethard Town Hall =

Municipal building in Fethard, County Tipperary, Ireland

- Halla an Bhaile Fiodh Ard
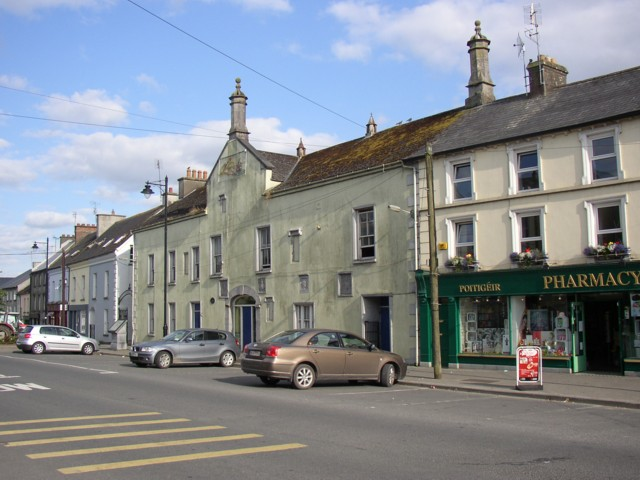
- Fethard Town Hall

- Location within Ireland

General information
- Architectural style: Neoclassical style
- Location: Main Street, Fethard, Ireland
- Coordinates: 52.4660°N 7.6951°W
- Completed: c.1610

Fethard Town Hall (Irish: Halla an Bhaile Fiodh Ard) is a municipal building on Main Street in Fethard, County Tipperary, Ireland. It is currently used as a museum space and hosts the Fethard Horse Country Experience.

== History ==
Following the granting of a new charter by King James VI and I in 1608, Fethard Corporation was directed to build "a tholsel (common hall) for assemblies". The main landowner, Sir John Everard, responded by laying out Main Street and commissioning almshouses for the poor people of the town.

The new building was designed in the neoclassical style, built in rubble masonry and was completed in around 1610. The design involved a broadly symmetrical long main frontage with a central gable facing onto Main Street. There were four doorways on the ground floor providing access to the individual almshouses and a series of cross-windows on the first floor. The coats of arms of Sir John Everard and another local landowner, James Butler, 2nd/12th Baron Dunboyne, whose seat was at Kiltinan Castle, were fixed to the front of the building.

By the mid-18th century, the building was no longer operating as a facility for the poor and an assembly room had been established on the first floor, which was used as a courtroom as well as a meeting place for the corporation. The corporation was abolished under the Municipal Corporations (Ireland) Act 1840 but the building was soon brought back into use by the town commissioners who were first appointed at that time. The east end of the building was used as library from the late 19th century. For most of the 20th century, the ground floor served as the local fire station, while the assembly room on the first floor was used as a community events venue, hosting dances and theatre performances. Scenes from the film, Stella Days, starring Martin Sheen, were shot in the town hall in 2010.

An extensive programme of refurbishment works, involving the replacement of the cement render on the front of the building as well as the conversion of the interior for museum use, was initiated in October 2014. The works, which cost €1.6 million, were financed by grants from the Department of Rural and Community Development, Fáilte Ireland and Tipperary County Council as well as by a series of private donors including the owner of the Coolmore Stud, John Magnier, and the owner of the Watership Down Stud, Andrew Lloyd Webber. The building was officially re-opened by the Minister of State at the Department of Defence, Paul Kehoe, as the Fethard Horse Country Experience in May 2017. Items in the collection include the skeleton of Sadler's Wells, a 14-time champion sire.
