= Redmond Everard =

Sir Redmond Everard (fl.1585) was an Irish politician and landowner from Fethard, County Tipperary: the Everard family for generations effectively owned the town of Fethard. He was the son of John Everard. In the Parliament of 1585–6, he sat in the Irish House of Commons as one of the Members of Parliament (MPs) for County Tipperary.

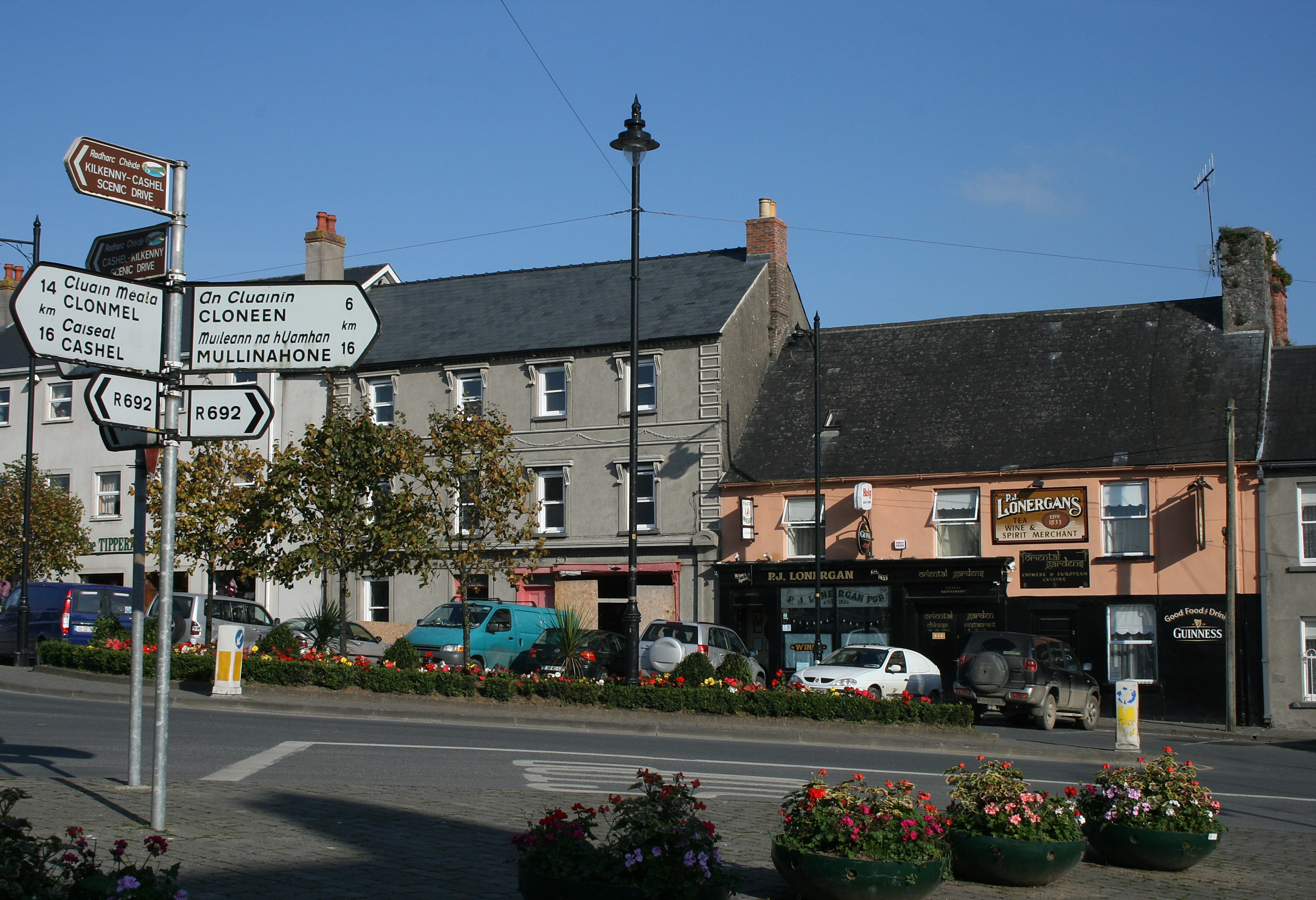
Fethard, County Tipperary

Little is known of his wife. His eldest son Sir John Everard (c.1550–1624) was a barrister, politician and judge. John's son Richard (c. 1590-c.1660) was the first of the Everard baronets. Redmond's younger son James (living 1609) was a Jesuit: both James and his brother openly professed their [[Roman Cath[olic]] faith, despite the penalties imposed on members of that faith under the Penal Laws.
