= Market House, Monaghan =

Georgian market house in Monaghan town, Ireland

Market House
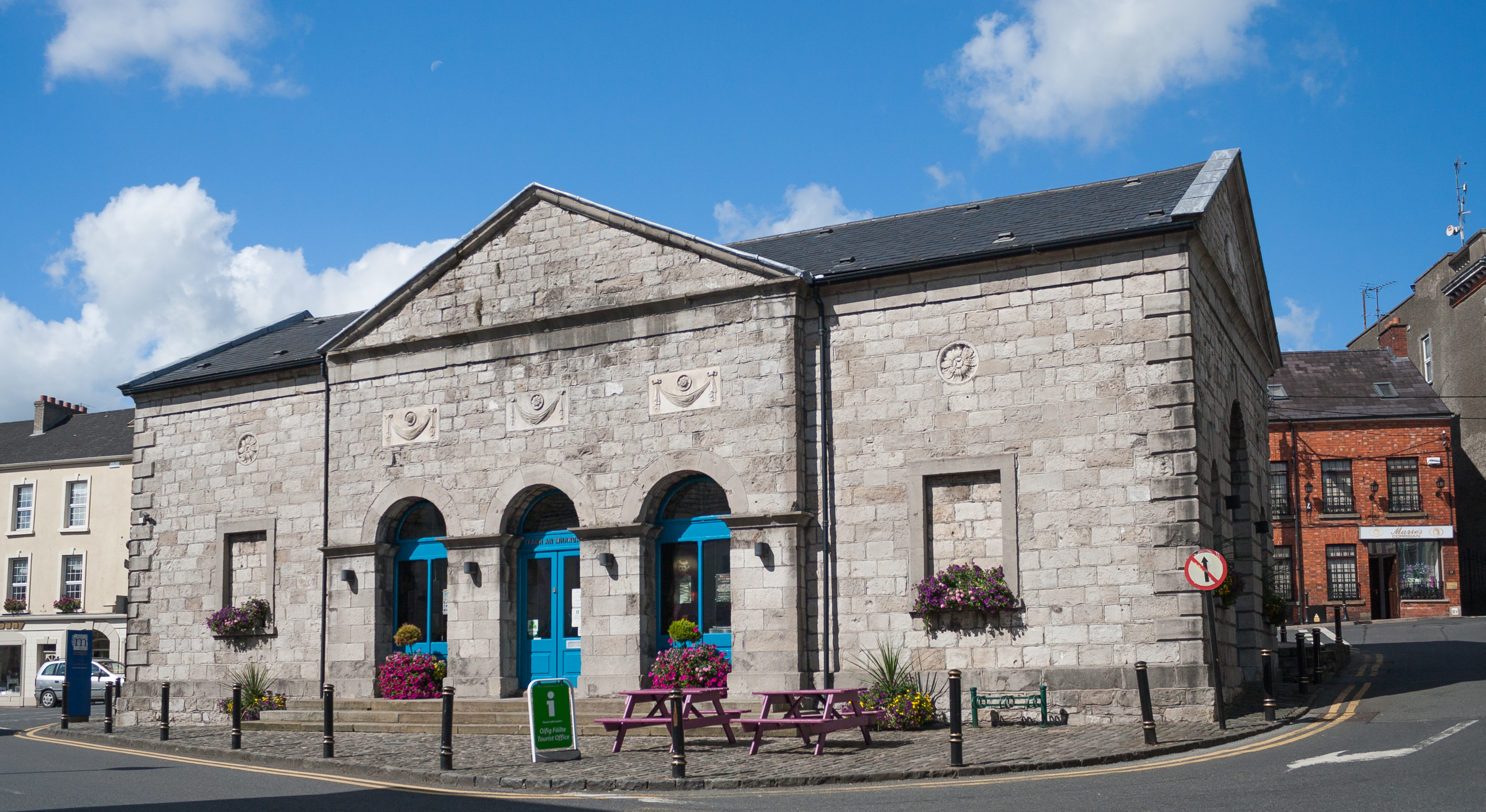
- The restored Market House in 2016
- Interactive map of the Market House area

General information
- Location: Market Square, Monaghan, Ireland
- Coordinates: 54.247513°N 6.972359°W
- Completed: 1792

Design and construction
- Architect: Colonel William Hayes

The Market House, in Monaghan, Ireland, was designed by Colonel William Hayes of Avondale, Rathdrum, County Wicklow, and stands in the middle of Market Square. Completed in 1792, the building is of five bays in length with the centre three arches projected with a secondary pediment. The outer bays contain blank windows. The ends of the Market House have large rusticated arches flanked by round headed niches. Above all the arches are inset panels with festoons while the blank windows and niches have medallions. At the eastern end the pediment contains a carved Conygham (later Rossmore) coat of arms.

== Today ==
The Market House in 1979

Inside the market house in 2016

After lying empty for many years, the Department of Arts, Sports and Tourism awarded Monaghan County Council €746,000 in 2001 to refurbish the Market House as an arts venue. The development work started in August 2002 and was completed in February 2003. The building was officially opened by the Minister for Arts, Sports and Tourism on 28 November 2003. This new venue is suitable for arts events such as exhibitions, musical performances, readings, workshops and rehearsals.

== See also ==
- Market Houses in the Republic of Ireland
