= Joan de Sales La Terriere =

Irish socialite (1889–1968)

Joan Mary de Sales La Terriere (1889–1968) was an Irish socialite and equestrienne, born in County Tipperary. She was one of the early luminaries of show jumping. She was also the last plaintiff from Ireland to secure a parliamentary divorce via a bill in Westminster.

== Early life and career ==
She was born at Castle Grace, County Tipperary, the estate of her father Samuel Grubb, a member of the local gentry. Her mother was Alice Hannah Binney.

As Joan Grubb, she first came to public attention by abandoning the convention of riding sidesaddle, as was expected of women. She was the first woman to ride astride at the Olympia London International Horse Show, where her 'gentleman's' style of riding caused controversy, she persisted in doing so at other international competitions. Mark Bence-Jones in his book Twilight of the Ascendancy, described the then Joan Grubb as one of the "fast women" who was viewed with suspicion for their contempt for the traditional role of women. She became friends with other outspoken women of her day, including Dorothea Conyers and Constance Markievicz.

Her riding career was cut short at the outbreak of World War One, where she served as an ambulance driver with the Red Cross. She married Gerard Arthur O'Callaghan on 14 October 1914, two months after the outbreak of World War I. The son of a general, he served as an officer in the 18th Irish Regiment and was killed at Flanders on 24 May 1915. After the war she married her second husband, Lieut. Col. F.J.B. de Sales La Terriere, a Scotsman.

== Divorce and death ==
After the war, Joan de Sales La Terriere again came to public attention by going to the House of Lords in London to have her marriage to Lieut. Col. de Sales La Terriere dissolved through a private members bill. The marriage was duly dissolved. This was to be the last dissolution of an Irish marriage for over 70 years, until divorce again became legal in Ireland after its 1995 Referendum on Divorce.

She had two children with La Terriere, Tara and Roderick (Rory, named after Rory O'Connor, was killed during World War two.) As she was a woman without religion she was buried in the grounds of her home, Kiltinan Castle in 1968.
