= Market houses in Northern Ireland =

Market houses are a notable feature of several Northern Ireland towns. While these market houses vary in styles of architecture, size and ornamentation, many were designed with three, four or even five bays on the ground floor which were an open arcade. An upper floor was often used as a court house or ballroom. Ornamentation consisted of a cupola, a clock or sometimes a dome or tower. Today most of the market houses in Ireland have been put to use as cultural venues or business premises. Some are still derelict.

== Table of market houses locations ==
Town	County	Date built	Current use	Image	Note
Antrim	Antrim	1726	Vacant (formerly court house)		
Armagh	Armagh	1815	Library and learning centre		
Aughnacloy	Tyrone	–	Shops		
Ballycastle	Antrim	1830 c.	Local museum		
Ballyclare	Antrim	18th century ?	Demolished 1866, Town Hall built on site		
Ballyclare	Antrim	19th century	(2nd Market House) Shopping centre		
Ballygawley	Tyrone	19th century	Now an accountant's office		
Ballymena	Antrim	1684	Burnt down 1919, town hall built on site in 1924		History of Ballymena, photograph of Market House
Ballymoney	Antrim	1755 c.	masonic hall		
Ballynahinch	Down	1795	Community centre		History of Ballynahinch Market House
Banbridge	Down	1832	Offices		
Bangor	Down	1810 or 1780	Bank		
Belfast (Waring Street)	Antrim	1769	Formerly a bank, now unused		Belfast markets history
Belfast (St George's Market)	Antrim	1890s	Still in use as market		
Brookeborough	Fermanagh	1837 (before)	Vacant ? (Formerly Orange Hall)		
Caledon	Tyrone	1830 c.	–		
Carrickfergus	Antrim	1755 ?	Art gallery		
Castlewellan	Down	1764 c.	Library		
Clogher	Tyrone	1837	–		
Crossgar	Down	1829	Boarded up and missing its clock		
Cushendall	Antrim	1858			
Dervock	Antrim	1805	Café and hairdressers		
Donaghadee	Down	1819 c.	Shops		
Draperstown	Londonderry	1839	A library on the ground Floor; a toddlers' playgroup on the first floor		
Dromara	Down	1830 c.	Masonic hall		
Dromore	Down	18th century	Replaced in 1886		
Dromore	Down	1886	Library		
Ederney	Fermanagh	1839 c. Rebuilt in 1889 as a town hall	Redeveloped in 1989 as a community centre		
Eglinton	Londonderry	1825	Occupied by Faughanvale Credit Union		
Hillsborough	Down	1760 c.; 2nd phase c. 1810	Court house and tourist information centre		
Hilltown	Down	1828	Part of a public house		
Irvinestown	Fermanagh	1835 (before)	Shop		
Kilkeel	Down	1800	Upper floor was used as a courthouse. Demolished in 1952		
Killyleagh	Down	1788 c.	"Drop-in" centre		
Lisbellaw	Fermanagh	1830 c.	Butchers		
Lisburn	Antrim	18th century ?	Irish linen centre and museum		
Loughgall	Armagh	1746	–		
Maghera	Londonderry	18th century ?	Replaced in 1824		
Maghera	Londonderry	1824	(2nd market house) Offices		
Maguiresbridge	Fermanagh	1835 c.	Vacant ?		
Markethill	Armagh	–	Shop		
Middletown	Armagh	1829	Offices		
Moira	Down	1810 c.	Offices ?		
Moneymore	Londonderry	1819	Public house and vacant		
Moneymore	Londonderry	1839	Shops and private houses		
Newtownards	Down	1765	See full article on Market House, Newtownards		
Newtownbutler	Fermanagh	1830 c.	–		
Portaferry	Down	1752	Sub-office of Northern Ireland Housing Executive		
Randalstown	Antrim	1831	Library (previously court house)		
Rathfriland	Down	1770 c.	–		
Saintfield	Down	1802	Orange Hall		
Toome	Antrim	1830 (before)	Bookmaker		
Trillick	Tyrone	1820 c.	Masonic hall		

== See also ==
- Architecture of Ireland
- List of country houses in the United Kingdom
- List of towns and villages in Northern Ireland
- List of market houses in the Republic of Ireland
- Tholsel

== Sources ==
- A Topographical Dictionary of Ireland, Samuel Lewis (1838)
- Buildings at Risk (various volumes), Ulster Architectural Heritage Society
- Saintfield Conservation Area, The Planning Service Agency, Department of the Environment for Northern Ireland
