= John Everard (MP, died 1624) =

Irish barrister, politician and judge

Sir John Everard (c. 1550 – 1624) was an Irish barrister, politician and judge. He was notable as the last Irish judge until the reign of James II to openly profess the Roman Catholic faith. His religious beliefs eventually led to his enforced resignation from the Bench in 1607.

He then entered politics and was a member of the Irish Parliament of 1613–1615. The Catholic members elected him as speaker of the House of Commons and installed him in the speaker's chair, but due to the creation of new pocket boroughs by James I, the Protestants had the majority and elected Sir John Davies. Everard, in a farcical scene, initially refused to vacate the chair until he was literally sat upon, which caused him to fall into disgrace for a time, but he was later restored to royal favour. His second son Sir Richard Everard was created the first of the Everard baronets of Ballyboy.

== Background ==
He was a native of Fethard, County Tipperary, and was the eldest son of Sir Redmond Everard, head of a Roman Catholic family which effectively owned the town of Fethard. Nothing seems to be known about his mother.

He entered the Inner Temple in 1578, and after an unusually long delay was called to the Bar in 1590. It has been suggested that he had not initially intended to practise at the Bar, and only changed his mind when he had a family to support. Nonetheless, he soon earned a reputation as a "learned counsel", whose clients included several prominent members of the Butler dynasty, notably the Earl of Ormond, and was also in demand as an arbitrator. He entered the King's Inns, which after a hiatus of some years was revived in 1607. He had his own Chambers in the Inns, and initially, he and the Treasurer, Sir John Elliott of Balreask, were allowed to have their sons lodge with them, although this privilege was later withdrawn.

In 1602 he was appointed a justice of the Court of King's Bench and knighted. He also sat regularly in the Court of Castle Chamber, the Irish mirror image of Star Chamber. He went regularly on assize in Meath, Louth and Kilkenny.

== Judicial career ==
While several Irish judges secretly remained loyal to the Roman Catholic faith, Everard was unique among the judges of his era in openly professing it, as did his brother James, who became a Jesuit. This gave grave offence to the Crown, especially at a time when the Lord Deputy of Ireland was Sir Arthur Chichester, a firm Protestant who vigorously enforced the Penal Laws, even going to the lengths of executing Catholic bishops. Everard however was held in high regard by most of those who knew him – even Chichester liked him personally – and for a time he was allowed to retain office, partly due to the difficulty in finding a suitable replacement. In the long run, his position was untenable and he resigned, presumably under official pressure, in 1607. He was given a generous pension, and the office of chief judge, or seneschal, of the Palatine Court of Tipperary. The Earl of Ormond had palatine jurisdiction over the county of Tipperary, with power to appoint judges and sheriffs; the court was abolished by the County Palatine of Tipperary Act 1715, although that office was largely a sinecure, which was described contemptuously as "the judicial scrapheap". However, in the 1680s the workload was apparently heavy enough to require two judges. He remained a member of the King's Inns, and was made a bencher in 1609.

== Civic improvements ==
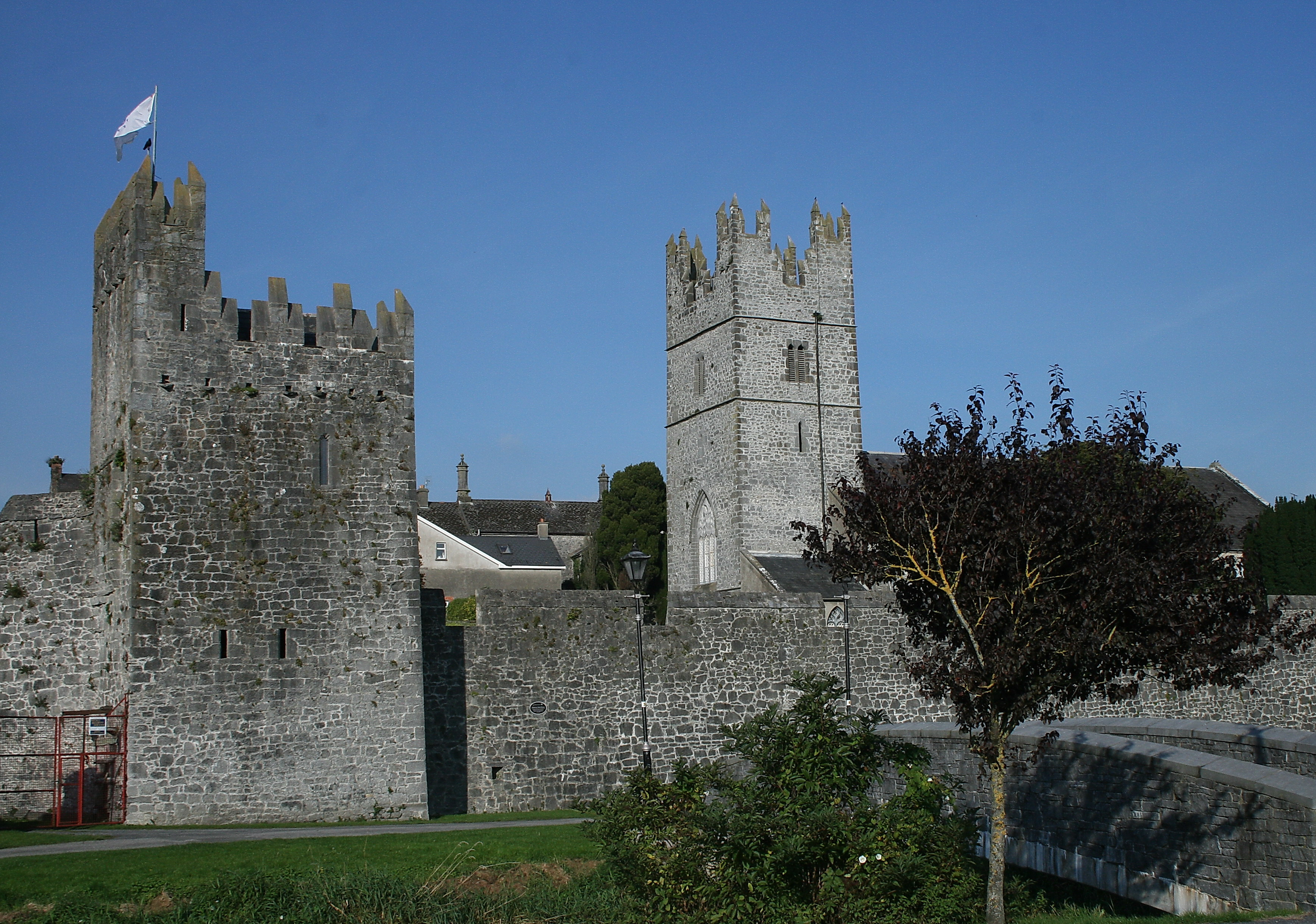
Fethard- the old walls

He was effectively the owner of the town of Fethard, and he did much to improve it, laying out the main street and building the Tholsel (Fethard Town Hall). He also held substantial lands in Tipperary and in County Waterford. Though he was accused by his opponents of engaging in dubious land dealings he was also noted for his acts of charity, and obtained a royal charter to found two almshouses in Fethard in 1611.

== Politics ==
In 1613 the only Irish Parliament of the reign of James I was called, and Everard was returned as member of the House of Commons for County Tipperary (his father had represented the same constituency in the Parliament of 1585–6). He was the choice of the Catholic members, who were still, if not a majority, at least a very large minority, as Speaker; but Lord Deputy Chichester was determined that his own right-hand man Sir John Davies, the Attorney General for Ireland, should be Speaker. The Catholic members, led by Thomas Luttrell, MP for Dublin, declared that Everard had been elected and he took the Speaker's chair. Matters then descended into farce when the Government declared that Davies had been elected Speaker: Everard, normally a man of good sense, foolishly refused to leave the chair until Davies, a very fat man, sat on him. Everard and his supporters then withdrew in protest.

As a result of his conduct, he was summoned to England. He unsuccessfully tried to put the case of the Catholic MPs, was imprisoned in the Tower of London, and was expelled from the King's Inns. He was soon freed, and on his return to Ireland he urged the Catholic community to show moderation, although he continued to press in Parliament for greater toleration for his co-religionists. Despite the debacle of his failed election as Speaker, he played an active role in the Parliament of 1613–5.

He was readmitted to the King's Inns, at the request, perhaps surprisingly, of Lord Deputy Chichester. Despite their differences in matters of religion, the two men had become friends and business partners, and Chichester wrote to the Council of the King's Inns, praising Everard's good conduct in Parliament, and suggesting that a man who was "so worthy in everything except religion" should be readmitted. The Council, apparently without much enthusiasm, complied. Among his fellow lawyers at the Inns was the judge and MP Sir Christopher Sibthorpe, noted for his strong Puritan beliefs and anti-Catholic polemics, but the two men seem to have avoided an open quarrel. Sibthorpe however was one of those who opposed Everard's readmission to the Inns, and more generally opposed the admission of Catholics to the Bar.

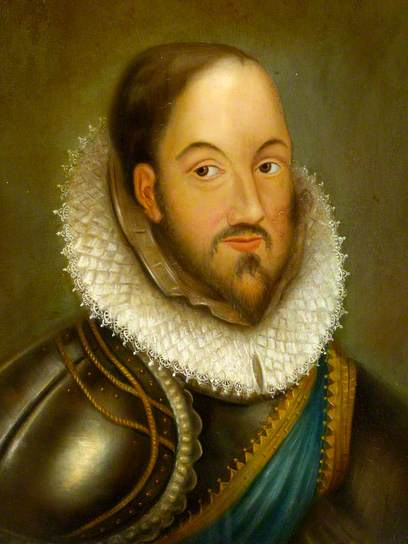
Arthur Chichester, 1st Baron Chichester, a good friend to Everard despite their religious differences

== Later years ==
After Chichester was recalled as Lord Deputy in 1616, Everard felt confident enough to write to the English Crown, urging the relaxation of the laws against recusancy, and for the admission of Catholics to the legal profession. His hopes of reform were quickly dashed, as Chichester's successor Oliver St John, 1st Viscount Grandison, continued the policy of persecuting recusants, especially priests. Nonetheless, Everard was still well regarded by the Crown, receiving several privileges in the form of the right to hold fairs and markets, although his religion now debarred him from playing a prominent role in public affairs. He continued to diligently manage the business affairs of the Ormonde family. He was briefly imprisoned in 1620 for unknown reasons. In the same year, he settled substantial estates on his second son Richard, who was made a Baronet two years later. In his last years, he enjoyed the friendship of the powerful Anglo-Irish magnate Richard Boyle, 1st Earl of Cork, with whom he engaged in several business transactions, and whom he entertained at his home shortly before his death in 1624.

== Family ==
He married Catherine Comerford, daughter of Fulke (or Fulco) Comerford of Callan, County Kilkenny and Rosina Rothe, and sister of his judicial colleague Gerald Comerford. Catherine probably died before 1624, as she was not mentioned in her husband's last will and testament.

John and Catherine had at least four sons, including:

1. Nicholas, a barrister, who was admitted to the Inner Temple in 1604, and in 1607 to the King's Inns where, as a special privilege, he was allowed to share his father's chambers.
2. Richard, who in his father's lifetime was created a Baronet, of Ballyboy, County Tipperary. He became a prominent member of Confederate Ireland, and was condemned to death by the victorious Cromwellian forces in 1651. He was reprieved, and died in prison about 1660.
3. Gilbert.
4. John.

and also an unnamed daughter, who married Henry White fitzWhite.
