= William Everard =

William Everard may refer to:

- Wiliam Everard (fl. 14th century), MP for Norwich in the 4th Parliament of Henry IV (5 Hen. 4 / 5 H. 4; 1404, Jan.)
- William Everard (Digger) (c. 1602 – d. in or after 1651), early leader of the Diggers
- William Everard (Victorian politician) (1869–1950), member of the Victorian Legislative Assembly for the electoral district of Evelyn
- William Everard (South Australian politician) (1819–1889), member of South Australia's Legislative Assembly and Legislative Council
- William Everard (brewer), founder of Everards Brewery in Leicester
  - Sir William Lindsay Everard (1891–1949), brewer and grandson of the first William Everard, politician and philanthropist from Leicestershire, United Kingdom
