= Everard baronets of Much Waltham (1629) =

Baronetcy in the Baronetage of England

Coat of arms of the Everard baronets of Much Waltham

The Everard baronetcy, of Much Waltham in the County of Essex, was created in the Baronetage of England on 29 January 1629 for Richard Everard of Langleys, son of Hugh Everard and nephew of Anthony Everard, Member of Parliament for East Looe.

The 2nd baronet represented Westminster in Parliament from 1661 to 1678. The 4th baronet served as Governor of North Carolina from 1725 to 1731. The title became extinct on the death of the 6th baronet in 1745.

== Everard baronets, of Much Waltham (1629) ==
- Sir Richard Everard, 1st Baronet (died 1680)
- Sir Richard Everard, 2nd Baronet (1625–1694)
- Sir Hugh Everard, 3rd Baronet (c.1654–1706)
- Sir Richard Everard, 4th Baronet (c. 1683–1733)
- Sir Richard Everard, 5th Baronet (died 1742)
- Sir Hugh Everard, 6th Baronet (died 1745)
