= Tholsel =

Old Irish town municipal and administrative building

Tholsel was a name traditionally used for a local municipal and administrative building used to collect tolls and taxes and to administer trade and other documents in Irish towns and cities. It was at one stage one of the most important secular buildings in Ireland's town and cities and the level of importance was reflected in the prominence and size of these buildings as well as the expensive materials and architectural techniques used. Some historic tholsels still exist, notably The Tholsel, Kilkenny. Towards the end of the 18th century the term tholsel was typically swapped for Market House with many of the administrative functions of the original tholsel transferring to another dedicated local council or government building such as a court or sessions house.

Similar buildings called tolseys or tolsey houses are found in some English towns and cities, including Burford, Gloucester and Wotton-under-Edge. In both cases the term is derived from the Middle English tolsell, from tol ("toll") + -sell (Old English sele "hall", "house"). However, buildings described as a Tholsel have been more broadly used as a town hall, a courthouse, a town gate, a prison, a market house, a council chamber, a customs house, a guildhall, and a place where tolls were collected. In Scotland the term Tolbooth was used.

The Tholsel building in Dublin was built in the late Middle Ages as a merchants' hall, at the corner of Nicholas Street and Christ Church place, next to the Church of St. Nicholas Within. In the late 15th century, it was the home of the first mechanical public clock in Ireland. In the late eighteenth century, the Dublin Tholsel was used as a courthouse, being notable as the location where many Irish people, convicted of crimes, were sentenced to be transported to exile in Australia. It was demolished around the year 1820.

== Notable tholsels in the Republic of Ireland ==
Name	Location	Date built	Notes	Image
Tholsel, Town Gate	Carlingford	1450	It was originally 3 storeys high but the top floor has now been replaced with a modern pitched roof	
Main Guard	Clonmel	1675		
The Tholsel, Drogheda	Drogheda	1770		
The Tholsel, Dublin	Dublin 8	1682 – 1806	Located at Skinner's Row (now Christchurch Place). A city administrative building had been located on the site since the 1300s. Prior to James Malton's drawing in 1792 the Tholsel had a tower with cupola and Ireland's first public mechanical clock. A cock weathervane also sat above the cupola but was blown down along with the tower in a storm. The building fell into decline when it was superseded by City Hall, Dublin.	
The Tholsel, Galway	Galway	1639 – 1822	The arches of the arcade were pulled down in 1822 and used to construct a new building on Eyre Square in 1831 on the site of the old corn and potato market. This now houses a branch of the Bank of Ireland. The cupola had already been removed in 1800. Part of the back wall of the tholsel can be seen behind St Nicholas Collegiate Church.	
The Tholsel, Kilkenny	Kilkenny	1761		
The Tholsel, Limerick	Limerick	1673, Rebuilt 1702, Rebuilt 1778	located in Mary Street in the old Englishtown district of the city. It served as the headquarters of Limerick Corporation until that moved to the Exchange building on Nicholas Street. It was demolished in the early 20th century after it fell into dereliction.	
The Tholsel, New Ross	New Ross	1749, rebuilt in its current form 1806		
Westgate Tholsel	Carrick-on-Suir	1500		
Clock Gate	Youghal	1777	Used as a gaol and private dwelling at various times	

== See also ==
- List of market houses in the Republic of Ireland
- Market houses in Northern Ireland
- Tolbooth for some of the equivalent buildings in Scotland
