= Kiltinan Castle =

Castle in County Tipperary, Ireland

Kiltinan Castle is a castle near Fethard, County Tipperary, Ireland.

== History and architecture ==
Kiltinan is one of the oldest inhabited castles in Ireland, having been built in the thirteenth century. The castle stands upon an eminence of limestone rock and overlooks the Clashawley River.

Features of the castle demesne include the castellated gateway at its main entrance, its dovecote (pigeon house) which dates from the fifteenth century, its Sheila-na-Gig stone, and its pet graveyard, which dates to the early twentieth century.

== Owners ==
The first known inhabitants were the Butler family, of the branch which held the title Baron Dunboyne, and it was held by them until the 17th century, during the Cromwellian invasion into Ireland when the castle was attacked by Cromwell on 13 February 1650.

Following the bombardment, Kiltinan was extensively remodelled by the Cooke family in the eighteenth and nineteenth centuries.

The castle was first established as a racehorse stud farm in 1918, when it was bought by Capt. F.J.B. De Sales La Terriere, M.F.H. Although he was a British army officer, the castle was then a safe-house for the IRA during the Irish War of Independence and Kiltinan sometimes provided hospitality for British officers and fugitive rebels in turn. The captain's wife Joan de Sales La Terriere was a well-known horsewoman and socialite.

The stud farm which is attached to the castle is now run by Madeleine Gurdon, the wife of Andrew Lloyd Webber. She also runs the associated establishment in England, Watership Down Stud.

== See also ==
- Bulmer de Sales La Terriere
- Kiltinan Church Sheela-na-gig
