= Linstead (disambiguation) =

Linstead is a town in Jamaica.

Linstead may also refer to:

- Linstead Magna, Suffolk, England
- Linstead Parva, Suffolk, England
- Lynsted, Kent, England

== People ==
- George Linstead (1908–1974), British composer and music critic
- Hilary Linstead (1938–2022), British Australian talent agent
- Hugh Linstead (1901–1987), British pharmaceutical chemist, barrister, and politician
- Patrick Linstead (1902–1966), British chemist
