= The Tholsel, Kilkenny =

Municipal building in Kilkenny, County Kilkenny, Ireland

- An Tholsel, Cill Chainnigh
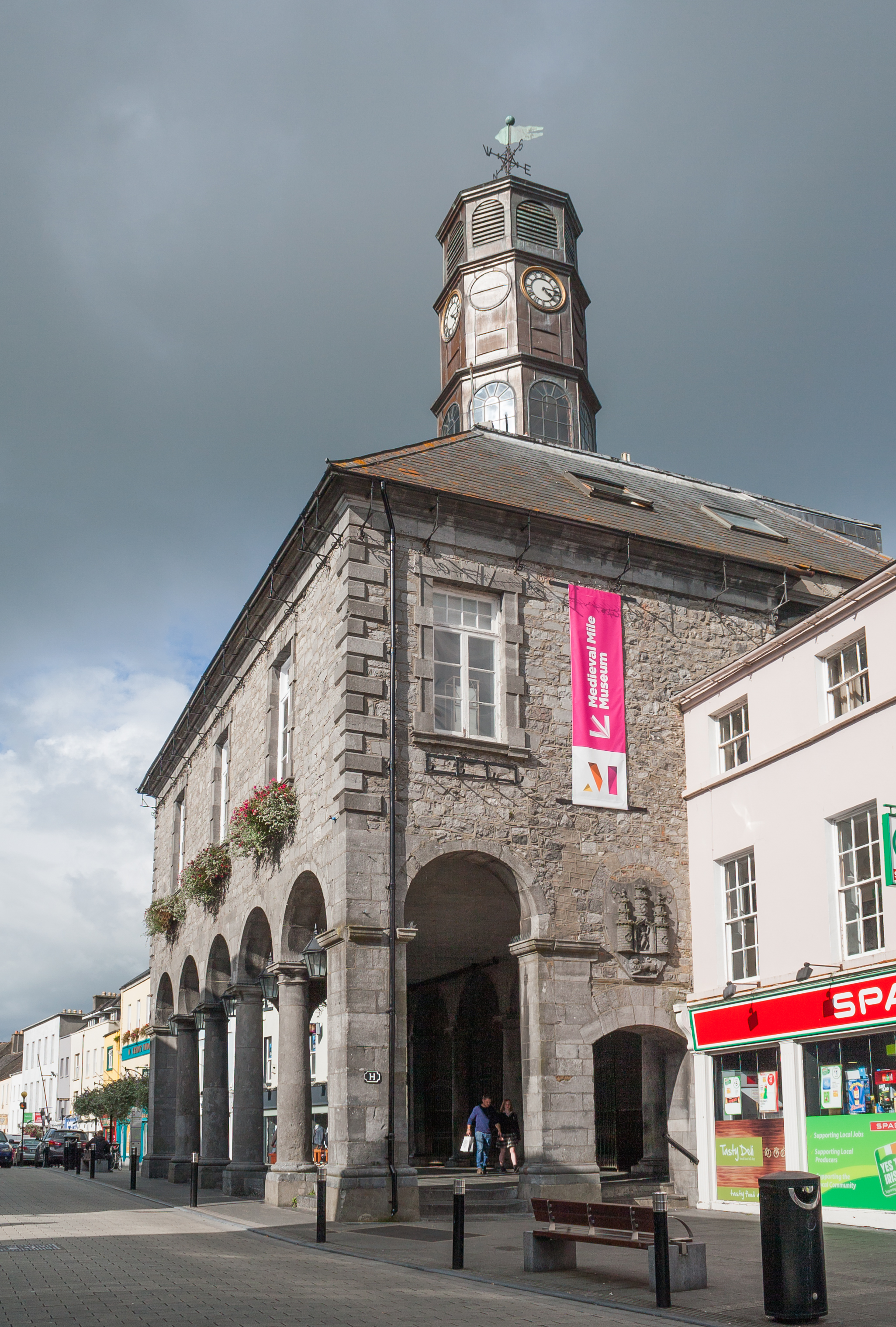
- The Tholsel, Kilkenny

- Location within Ireland

General information
- Architectural style: Neoclassical style
- Location: High Street, Kilkenny, Ireland
- Coordinates: 52.6519°N 7.2531°W
- Completed: 1761

The Tholsel (Irish: An Tholsel, Cill Chainnigh), also known as the Town Hall, is a municipal building in the High Street, Kilkenny, County Kilkenny, Ireland. It served as the meeting place by Kilkenny Borough Council until the council was abolished in 2014. The Municipal District of Kilkenny City, the Borough Council's successor within Kilkenny County Council, meets at County Hall.

== History ==
The first tholsel, or guildhall, in the High Street may have dated back to the 14th century. It was the likely location of the execution of Petronilla de Meath, a woman who was tried and found guilty, after torture, of heresy, and then flogged and burnt at the stake on 3 November 1324. It was used for the collection of tolls and other administrative functions for the town but fell into disuse in the late 15th century. A second tholsel, designed in the Renaissance style, was erected in the High Street in 1579.

By the mid-18th century, the earlier tholsel had become dilapidated and the borough council, led by Alderman William Colles, decided to commission a new building on the same site. The new building was designed in the neoclassical style, built in rubble masonry at a cost of £1,315 and was completed in 1761. The design involved a symmetrical main frontage of five bays facing west onto the High Street. It was arcaded on the ground floor, so that markets could be held, with an assembly room on the first floor. The arcading was formed by voussoirs which were supported by piers at the corners, and by Doric order columns between the bays. On the first floor, the building was fenestrated by square headed casement windows with Gibbs surrounds. At roof level, there was a three-stage octagonal cupola with round headed windows in the first stage, clock faces in the second stage and louvres in the third stage, surmounted by a weather vane. Internally, the principal room was the assembly room on the first floor, which featured a plasterwork cornice to the ceiling.

The theologian John Wesley visited the building soon after it was completed and preached to a small audience in July 1762. The Irish republican and leader of Fianna Fáil political party, Éamon de Valera, gave a speech in the town hall on his party's economic and financial policy in March 1929.

On 20 September 1985, the Tholsel was gutted by fire. That evening, fireman Joe Stapleton was completing his duties as the Town Sergeant when he discovered a fire on the upper floor of the building. He called the fire service, opened the main gates for the fire tenders and took the 17th-century charters of the city to safety. It took 35 firemen and six fire engines to fight this fire, which was started by a small electrical fault. The building was subsequently restored and re-opened to the public in February 1987. The assembly room continued to serve as the council chamber of Kilkenny Borough Council, until the council was dissolved and administration of the town was amalgamated with Kilkenny County Council in 2014.

Important documents held in the Tholsel include The Primus Kilkenniensis, or First Book of Kilkenny, printed in the late 14th century, which incorporates the charter given to the people of Kilkenny by William Marshal, 1st Earl of Pembroke in the early 13th century.
