= The Tholsel, Drogheda =

Municipal building in Drogheda, Ireland

- Halla an Bhaile
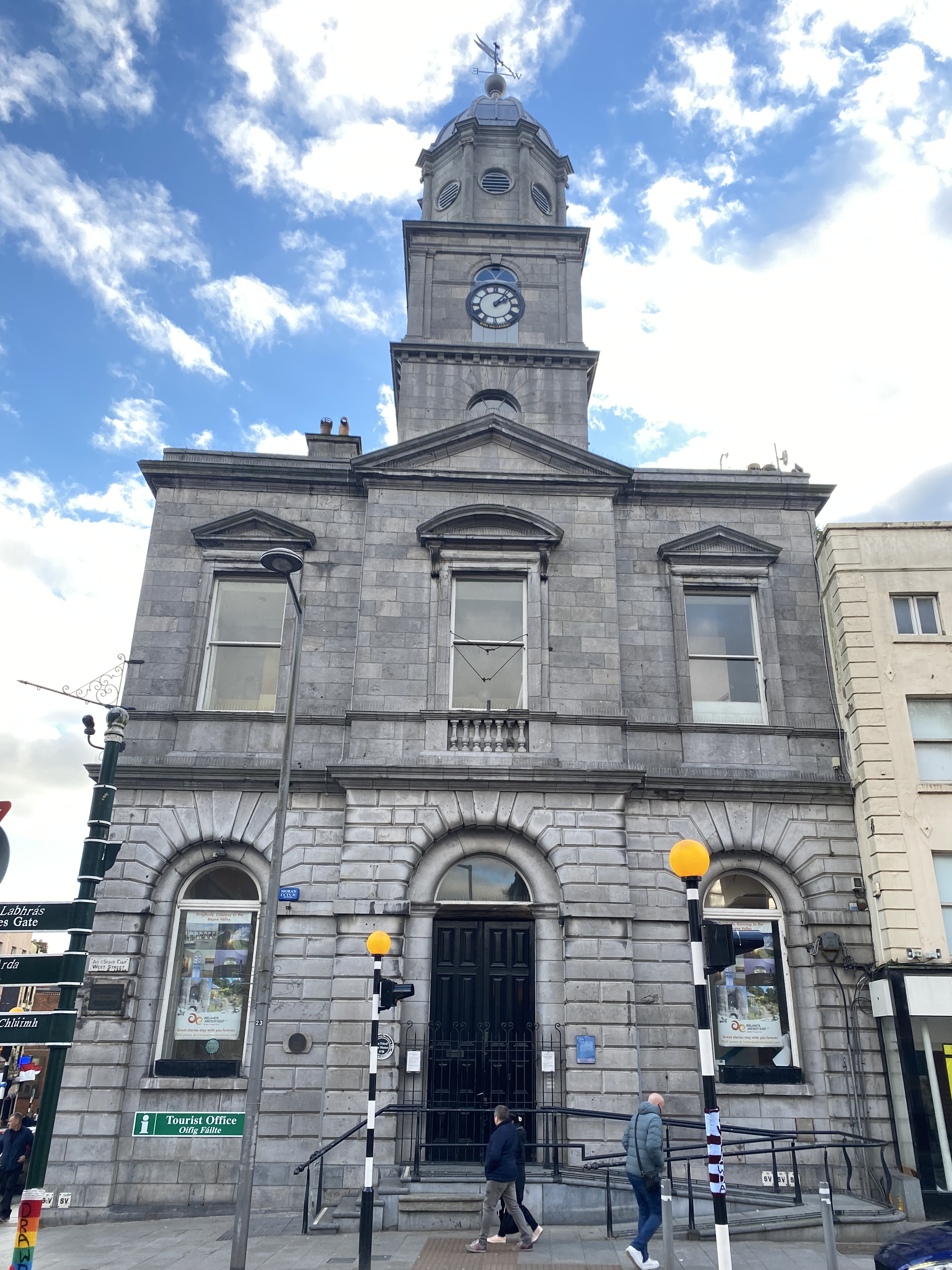
- The Tholsel, Drogheda

- Location within Ireland

General information
- Architectural style: Neoclassical, Georgian
- Location: West Street, Drogheda, Ireland
- Coordinates: 53.7148°N 6.3505°W
- Construction started: 1765
- Completed: 1770

Technical details
- Material: limestone

Design and construction
- Architects: Designed by George Darley and executed by Hamilton Bury
- Developer: Drogheda Corporation
- Other designers: Rowland Omer and Michael Richardson (1767)

Renovating team
- Architect: John Neville (1861) - conversion to courthouse

The Tholsel (Irish: Halla an Bhaile) is a municipal building in West Street, Drogheda, County Louth, Ireland. Formerly the meeting place of Drogheda Borough Council, it is currently used as a tourist information office.

== History ==
=== Old tholsel ===
The first tholsel, or guildhall, in the town was located at the north-west end of Shop Street and dated back at least to the 14th century. It was used for the collection of tolls and other administrative functions for the town. It was described as "a low building with a high front and clock-tower and built of wood". After the Battle of the Boyne in July 1690, King William III presented a pair of kettle drums, which bore the Royal coat of arms of the defeated monarch, King James II, to the borough council so that they could be displayed in the old tholsel. There were two large cellars in the basement which were used as a lock-up to incarcerate petty criminals from October 1724.

=== 1770 Tholsel ===
By the mid-18th century, the old tholsel had become dilapidated and the borough council decided to commission a new building on the same site. The foundations for the new building were laid in August 1765. The new building was designed by George Darley and executed by Hamilton Bury in the neoclassical style, built in limestone and was completed in April 1770. Other builders and designers recorded as being paid for works on the building at the time include Michael Richardson in 1763, 1764 and 1766 and later the architect Rowland Omer in 1767. George Darley's brother Hugh Darley was engaged to design the Mayoralty house in the same material and style in 1769 located about 200 metres away.

The design involved a symmetrical main frontage of three bays facing up St Peter's Street. The central bay, which was slightly projected forward, featured a round headed opening with a slightly recessed architrave and a fanlight on the ground floor, and a sash window with an architrave and a segmental pediment supported by brackets on the first floor. The central bay was surmounted by a triangular pediment. The outer bays were fenestrated by round headed windows with slightly recessed architraves on the ground floor, and by sash windows with architraves and triangular pediments on the first floor. At roof level there was a cornice, a parapet and a central three stage bell tower, with a small Diocletian window in the first stage, a clock surmounted by another small Diocletian window in the second stage and an octagonal-shaped belfry in the third stage, all surmounted by a dome.

Borough council meetings, the assizes, petty sessions and county court hearings were all held in the building. The leader of the Society of United Irishmen in Ardee and South Louth, Micheal Boylan, who was betrayed by his co-conspirator, Dan Kelly, to the local magistrates was executed by hanging outside the tholsel on 22 June 1798 during the Irish Rebellion of 1798.

After the borough council moved its headquarters to the corn exchange in Fair Street in 1899, the tholsel was converted into a branch of the Hibernian Bank to a design by William Henry Byrne in 1900. During the Irish Civil War, the clock faces were shot out by the Black and Tans and it was many months before they were replaced.

During the first half of the 20th century, the building suffered from dry rot and much of the ceiling and ornate plasterwork in the council chamber had to be dismantled. Hibernian Bank was acquired by the Bank of Ireland in 1958 and the branch was rebranded as Bank of Ireland in 1969. Following the closure of the Bank of Ireland branch in 2007, Drogheda Borough Council re-acquired the building in 2010 and initiated an extensive programme of refurbishment works, carried out to a design by van Dijk International, to convert the ground floor of the building into a tourist information centre. An exhibition entitled "Gateway to the Boyne Valley" was established in the building in 2016.
