= County Palatine of Tipperary Act 1715 =

Act of the Parliament of Ireland

County Palatine of Tipperary Act 1715 (Note: Short title given by the Statute Law Revision Act 2007 (No. 28))
- Act of Parliament
- Parliament of Ireland
- Long title: An Act for extinguishing the regalities and liberties of the county of Tipperary, and Cross-Tipperary, commonly called the County Palatine of Tipperary; and for vesting in his Majesty the estate of James Butler, commonly called James duke of Ormond; and for giving a reward of ten thousand pounds to any person, who shall seize of secure him, in case he shall attempt to land in this kingdom.
- Citation: 2 Geo. 1. c. 8 (I)
- Territorial extent: Ireland

Dates
- Royal assent: 20 June 1716
- Commencement: 12 November 1715 (Note: Start of session.)

Other legislation
- Amended by: Statute Law Revision (Ireland) Act 1878

Text of statute as originally enacted

The County Palatine of Tipperary Act 1715 (2 Geo. 1. c. 8 (I)) is an act of the Parliament of Ireland. This act enabled the purchase by the crown of the Palatine Rights in County Tipperary given to the Earls of Ormond, later Dukes of Ormonde, over the preceding centuries. Prior to the act, the dukes appointed the sheriffs and judges of the county and owned certain revenues from the county which would otherwise have gone to the Crown.

The passing of the act was followed almost at once by the attainder for treason of James Butler, 2nd Duke of Ormonde by the British Parliament passing the Attainder of Duke of Ormonde Act 1714 (1 Geo. 1. St. 2. c. 17). Ormonde fled to France on suspicion of being involved in the Jacobite Rising of 1715. Although his titles and estates were restored at the end of the 18th century to another branch of the Butler family, there was no question of reviving the palatine court, which was by then an anachronism.

== List of justices of the Palatine Court of Tipperary ==
Although the position of Chief Judge, or Seneschal, of the Palatine Court was widely regarded as a sinecure, it is interesting to note that several holders of the office were lawyers of repute, and at least two later held high judicial office. They included:

- John Talbot (died c.1575) barrister of Lincoln's Inn
- Sir John Everard, former judge of the Court of King's Bench (Ireland) (died 1624)
- Sir William Davys, later Lord Chief Justice of Ireland (died 1687)
- Sir John Keating, later Chief Justice of the Irish Common Pleas (died 1691)
- Sir John Meade, 1st Baronet (died 1707).

=== Second justice of the Palatine Court ===
There was also a second justice, sometimes called the Master of the Rolls, attached to the Palatine court, which suggests that the court's workload may have been heavier than generally believed. The name of at least three of the second justices are known:

- Samuel Gorges (1635-1686), later a justice of the Court of Common Pleas (Ireland)
- Sir Theobald Butler (1650-1721), later Solicitor General for Ireland
- Sir Standish Hartstonge, 2nd Baronet (c.1671-1751): he had no legal training, so far as is known, although he was the grandson of an eminent judge.

== Bibliography ==
- Ball, F. Elrington The Judges in Ireland 1221-1921 London John Murray 1926
- Hart, A. R. History of the King's Serjeant-at-law in Ireland Dublin Four Courts Press 2000
- Kenny, Colum King's Inns and the Kingdom of Ireland Dublin Irish Academic Press 1992
- Hayton, David The Anglo-Irish Experience 1680-1730, Politics, Identity and Patriotism Boydell Press 2012
