= John Everard (died 1445) =

English politician

John Everard (died 1445), of Salisbury, Wiltshire, was an English politician.

He was a member (MP) of the parliament of England for Great Bedwyn in 1420 (in the 9th Parliament of Henry V, 8 Hen. 5 / 8 H. 5) and Old Sarum in 1423 (in the 2nd Parliament of Henry VI, 2 Hen. 6 / 2 H. 6).
