= Mathias Everard =

Mathias Everard, KH (died 1857), was a major-general of Randilestown, County Meath. He was the third son of Thomas Everard of Randilestown, by his wife and cousin, Barbara, daughter of O'Reilly of Ballinlough Castle, and sister of Sir Henry Nugent, was appointed ensign in the 2nd or Queen's, regiment at Gibraltar 28 September 1804, and became lieutenant 21 March 1805. He served as Lieutenant-Governor of British Saint Lucia from 1839 to 1841.

== Military campaigns ==
In December 1805 the company to which young Everard belonged, with two others of his regiment and two of the 54th foot, were captured on their voyage home from Gibraltar by a French squadron of six sail of the line and some frigates, under Admiral Ganteaume, bound for Mauritius. The troops were put on board the Volontaire and carried about for three months, until the Volontaire ran into Table Bay for water, in ignorance of the recapture of the Cape by the British, and had to strike to the shore batteries. The troops were landed, and the companies of the Queen's did duty for some months at the Cape; but those of the 54th, to which Everard appears to have been temporarily attached for duty, were sent with the reinforcements to the Rio Plata, and acted as mounted infantry with the force under Sir Samuel Auchmuty.

While employed Everard led the forlorn hope at the storming of Montevideo 3 Feb. 1807, when twenty-two out of thirty-two men with him were killed or wounded. For this service Everard received a sword of honour from Lloyd's Patriotic Fund and the Freedom of the City of Dublin. He was also promoted, 23 April 1807, to a company in the 2nd battalion 14th foot, with which he served at the Battle of Corunna and in the Walcheren Campaign. During the latter he was thanked in general orders for his conduct at the siege of Flushing, 12 Aug. 1809, when the flank companies of the 14th, one of which he commanded, supported by the rest of the battalion, in conjunction with some of the German legion, stormed one of the enemy's batteries and effected a lodgment within musket-shot of the walls. He was subsequently transferred to the 1st battalion of his regiment in India, and commanded it at the siege of Hattrass in 1817. He commanded a flank battalion in the operations against the Pindarrees in 1818–19, was made regimental major 10 July 1821, and commanded it at the storming of Bhurtpore 29 December 1825, when the 14th headed one of the columns of assault, and unsupported cleared the breach after the premature explosion of a mine, and effected a junction with the other column led by the 59th foot, the steadiness and discipline of these two regiments, to quote the words of Lord Combermere, "deciding the fate of the day".

Everard was made C.B. and a brevet lieutenant-colonel. He became regimental lieutenant-colonel in 1831, and commanded the regiment for a period of sixteen years at home, in the West Indies, and North America. He was made C.B. in 1826, K.H. in 1831, and major-general 11 November 1851, and received a distinguished service pension. Everard, who had succeeded his elder brother in the family estate, died at Southsea, unmarried, on 20 April 1857.
