= Thomas Everard (Jesuit) =

English Jesuit (1560–1633)

Thomas Everard, Everett or Everat (1560–1633) was an English Jesuit.

== Life ==
Everard was born at Linstead, Suffolk, on 8 February 1560. He was the son of Henry Everard, a gentleman who suffered imprisonment for the Catholic faith, and of his wife, Catherine Gawdyr. After pursuing his studies at home for about six years and a half he was sent to Jesus College, Cambridge, where he remained for a year and a half. Becoming acquainted with Father John Gerard he made the spiritual exercises with him in London. Then he proceeded to Rheims, and was admitted into the English College there in 1592.

He studied philosophy and divinity at Rheims and Courtray, and was ordained priest 18 September 1592. Being admitted into the Society of Jesus he began his novitiate at Tournai on 4 June 1593, and after his simple vows he was sent, 17 June 1595, to the college at Lille. For several years he was minister at the college of St. Omer and at Watten, and socius and master of novices at Louvain. He took his last vows as a spiritual coadjutor in 1604. He was in England for a time in 1603–4, and had a marvellous escape from arrest. About 1617 he revisited this country, and exercised spiritual functions in Norfolk and Suffolk. A year after his arrival he was apprehended and detained in prison for two years. He was banished from the kingdom in March 1620–1 by virtue of a warrant from the lords. On endeavouring to return from exile in July 1623 he was seized at the port of Dover, but was eventually released on bail with the loss of his "books, pictures, and other impertinences".

Everard's name appeared in John Gee's list of priests and Jesuits of the London area in 1624, and also in a catalogue seized at Clerkenwell, the London residence of the order, in 1628. He was then a missioner in Suffolk. He died in London on 16 May 1633.

There is an engraved portrait of him in Matthias Tanner's Societas Jesu Apostolorum Imitatrix.

== Works ==
- Meditations on the Passion of Our Lord, St. Omer, 1604, 1606, 1618; a translation from the Latin of Father Fulvius Androtus.
- The Paradise of the Soul, and a treatise on Adhering to God, translated from the Latin of Albert the Great, bishop of Ratisbon, St. Omer, 1606 and 1617, frequently reprinted.
- Translation of Father Francis Arias's Treatise on Perfection, St. Omer, 1617.
- The Mirrour of Religious Perfection, from the Italian of Father Luca Pinelli, St. Omer, 1618. Originally a translation from Jean Gerson.
- Treatise on the Method of Living Well, a translation, St. Omer, 1620, 12mo.
- Translation of St. Francis Borgia's Practice of Christian Works, St. Omer, 1620, 12mo.
- Meditations upon the Holy Eucharist, from the Italian of Luca Pinelli, St. Omer, 1622, 12mo. The original work was by Jean Gerson.
- Translation of A Manual on Praying Well by Father Peter Canisius, St. Omer, 1622, 12mo.
- Translation of Father Ludovicus de Ponte's Compendium of Meditations, St. Omer, 1623, 12mo.
- Translation of Father Peter Ribadeneira's treatise, De Principe Christiano, St. Omer, 1624, 12mo.
- A Dialogue on Contribution and Attrition, which passed through four editions.
- The Eternall Felicitie of the Saints, translated from the Latin of Cardinal Bellarmin. The first edition was probably printed at Roger Anderton's secret press in Lancashire about 1624. It was reprinted at St. Omer in 1638, 12mo.
