= John Everard (footballer) =

Australian rules footballer

Personal information
- Full name: John Alphonsus Everard
- Born: 6 April 1881; Warrenheip, Victoria
- Died: 1 October 1952 (aged 71); Fitzroy, Victoria
- Original team: Castlemaine

Playing career^{1}
Years	Club	Games (Goals)
1905	Essendon	1 (0)
- ^{1} Playing statistics correct to the end of 1905.

John Alphonsus Everard (6 April 1881 – 1 October 1952) was an Australian rules footballer who played with Essendon in the Victorian Football League (VFL).
