= Everard baronets =

Set index for Everard baronets

There have been three baronetcies created for persons with the surname Everard, one in the Baronetage of Ireland, one in the Baronetage of England and one in the Baronetage of the United Kingdom. As of 2026 one creation is extant.

- Everard baronets of Ballyboy (1622)
- Everard baronets of Much Waltham (1629)
- Everard baronets of Randlestown (1911)
