= County palatine =

Area with special autonomy from the rest of a kingdom or empire

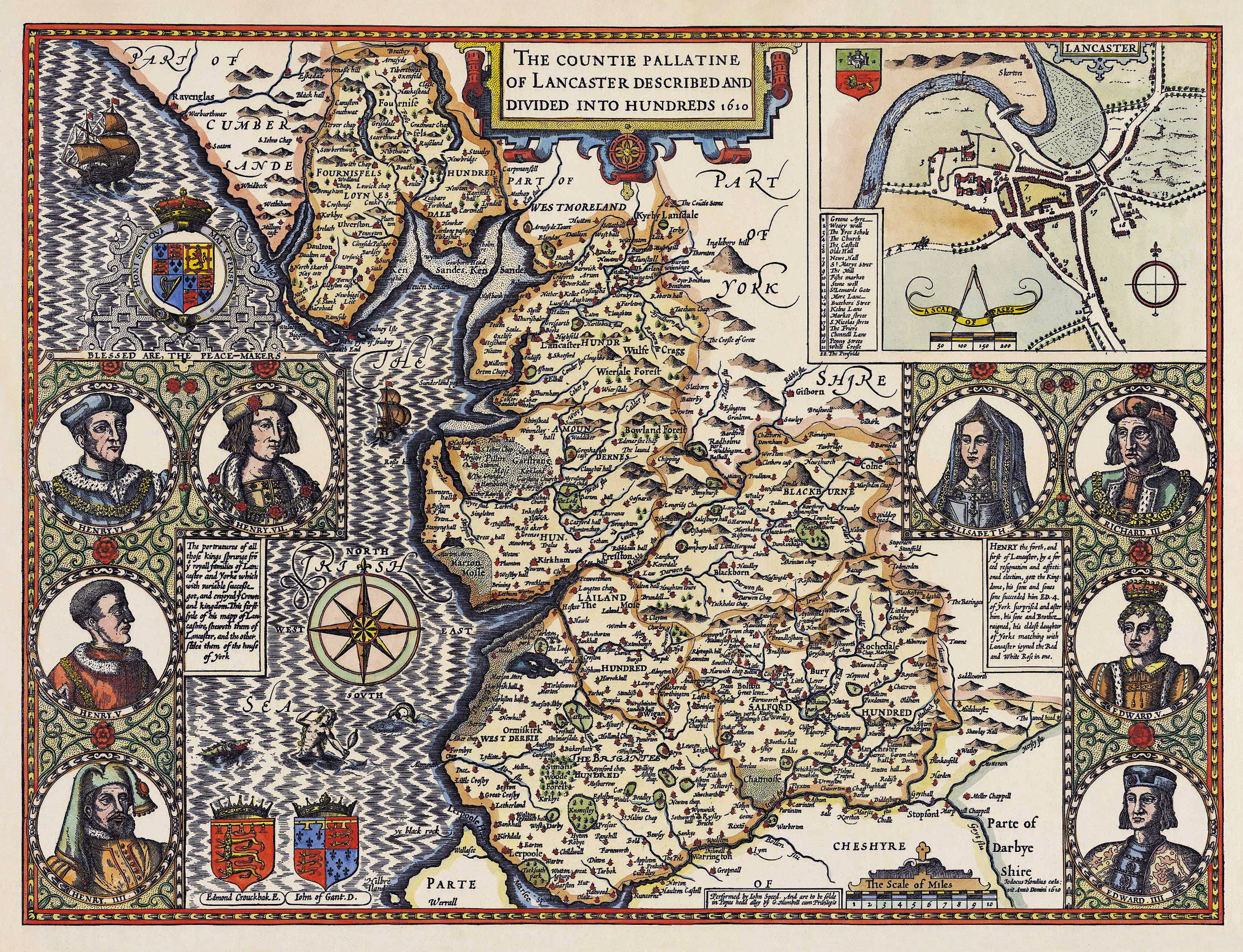
John Speed's map of the County Palatine of Lancaster 1610

In England, Wales and Ireland a county palatine or palatinate was an area ruled by a hereditary nobleman enjoying special authority and autonomy from the rest of a kingdom. The name derives from the Latin adjective palātīnus, "relating to the palace", from the noun palātium, "palace". It thus implies the exercise of a quasi-royal prerogative within a county, that is to say, a jurisdiction ruled by an earl, the English equivalent of a count. A duchy palatine is similar but is ruled over by a duke, a nobleman of higher precedence than an earl or count.

The nobleman swore allegiance to the monarch yet had the power to rule the county largely independently of the king. It should therefore be distinguished from the feudal barony, held from the king, which possessed no such independent authority. Rulers of counties palatine created their own feudal baronies, to be held directly from them in capite, such as the Barony of Halton. County palatine jurisdictions were created in England under the rule of the Norman dynasty, while in continental Europe they have an earlier date.

In general, when a palatine-type autonomy was granted to a lord by the sovereign, it was in a district on the periphery of the kingdom, at a time when the district was at risk from disloyal armed insurgents who could retreat beyond the borders and re-enter. For the English sovereign in Norman times, this applied to northern England, Wales and Ireland. As the authority granted was hereditary, some counties palatine legally survived well past the end of the feudal period.

== History ==
=== Durham, Chester, and Lancaster ===
Palatinates emerged in England in the decades following the Norman conquest, as various earls or bishops were granted palatine ("from the palace") powers, i.e. powers of a sort elsewhere exercised by the king. In some places this may have been in part a defensive measure, enabling local authorities to organise the defence of vulnerable frontier areas at their own discretion, avoiding the delays involved in seeking decisions from the court and removing obstructions to the coordinated direction of local resources at the discretion of a single official. However, palatine powers were also granted over areas such as the Isle of Ely which were not near any frontier.

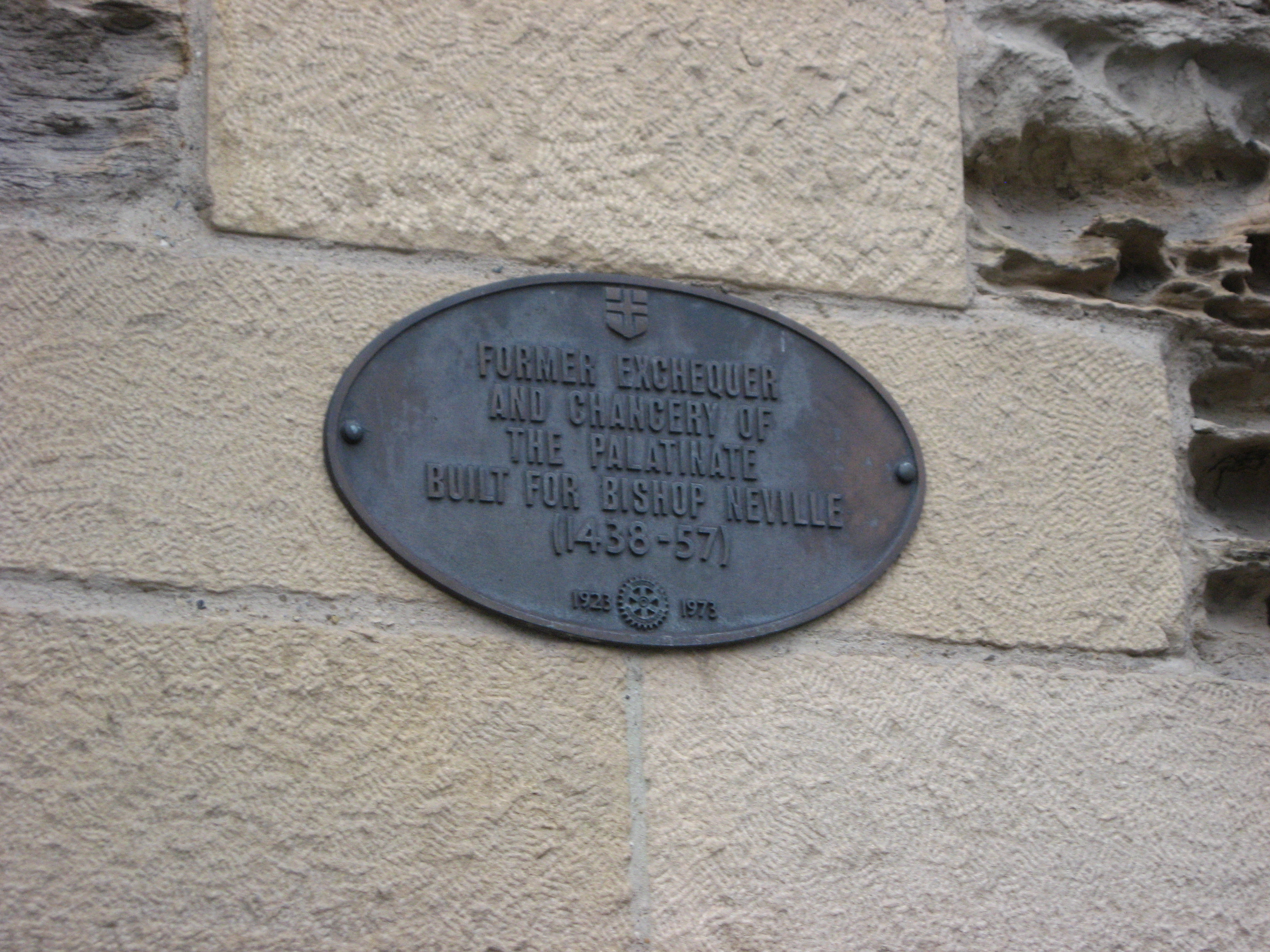
Plaque commemorating the former site of the exchequer and chancery of the County Palatine of Durham on Palace Green, near the castle and cathedral.

Palatine powers over Cheshire were acquired by the earls of Chester, a title which has since 1254 been reserved for the heir apparent to the throne (apart from a brief tenure in 1264–1265 by Simon de Montfort, who had seized control of the government from Henry III). Chester had its own parliament, consisting of barons of the county, and was not represented in Parliament until 1543, while it retained some of its special privileges until 1830.

Exceptional powers were also granted to the bishops of Durham, who during the aftermath of the Norman conquest had been put in charge of secular administration in what became County Durham. The autonomous power exercised by these bishops over the County Palatine of Durham was particularly enduring: Durham did not gain parliamentary representation until 1654, while the bishops of Durham retained their temporal jurisdiction until 1836.

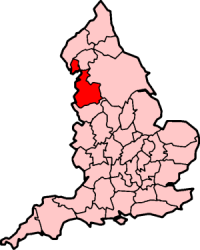
Boundary of the County Palatine of Lancaster within England

Palatine powers over Lancashire were conferred on the first duke of Lancaster in 1351, at the same time as his promotion from the status of earl. This was only the second dukedom created in England, following that of Cornwall in 1337, which also became associated with palatine powers. The dukedom was united with the Crown on the accession of Henry IV in 1399, but the vast estates of the Duchy of Lancaster were never assimilated into the Crown Estate, continuing even today to be separately administered for the monarch as Duke of Lancaster. The rights exercised through the Duchy, rather than the Crown, included its palatine powers over Lancashire, the last of which were revoked only in 1873. In the county palatine of Lancaster, the loyal toast is to "the King, Duke of Lancaster".

The king's writs did not run in these three palatine counties until the nineteenth century and, until the 1970s, Lancashire and Durham had their own courts of chancery (see Court of Chancery of the County Palatine of Lancaster and Court of Chancery of the County Palatine of Durham and Sadberge).

The appeal against a decision of the county court of a county palatine had, in the first instance, to be to the court of common pleas of that county palatine.

There are two kings in England, namely, the lord king of England wearing a crown and the lord bishop of Durham wearing a mitre in place of a crown ...

— William de St Botolph (1302)

=== Other counties palatine in England ===
At various times in history, the following areas had palatinate status: Shropshire, Kent, the Isle of Ely and Hexhamshire in Northumberland.

Although not formally categorised as a palatinate, in Cornwall many of the rights associated with palatinates were conferred on the Duke of Cornwall, a title created in 1337 and always held by the heir apparent to the throne.

=== Outside England ===
==== Wales ====
In the history of Wales in the Norman era, the term most often used is Marcher Lord, which is similar to, but not strictly the same as, a Palatine Lord. Nevertheless, a number of strictly Palatine jurisdictions were created in Wales. One example was the Earldom of Pembroke (until the passing of the Laws in Wales Act 1535).

==== Ireland ====
There were several palatine districts in Ireland of which the most notable were those of the Earls of Desmond and the Earls of Ormond in County Tipperary. The latter continued in existence until it was abolished by the County Palatine of Tipperary Act 1715.

==== Scotland ====
In Scotland, the earldom of Strathearn was identified as a county palatine in the fourteenth century, although the title of Earl of Strathearn has usually been merged with the crown in subsequent centuries and there is little indication that the status of Strathearn differed in practice from other Scottish earldoms.

==== American Colonies ====
In the colonies, the historic Province of Avalon in Newfoundland was granted palatine status, as was Maryland under Cecilius Calvert, 2nd Baron Baltimore.

== See also ==
- Marcher Lord—very similar to a palatine lord in the Middle Ages.
- Margrave—very similar to a palatine lord in the Middle Ages.
- Count palatine—sometimes similar to a palatine lord, but this term was not in use in Britain
- Duchy of Lancaster
- Justice of Chester
- Honour (feudal land tenure)
- English feudal barony
- Scottish feudal barony
- Irish feudal barony
- Electoral Palatinate
- Vavasour
