= Fethard, County Tipperary =

Town in County Tipperary, Ireland

Fethard Fiodh Ard (Irish)
- Town
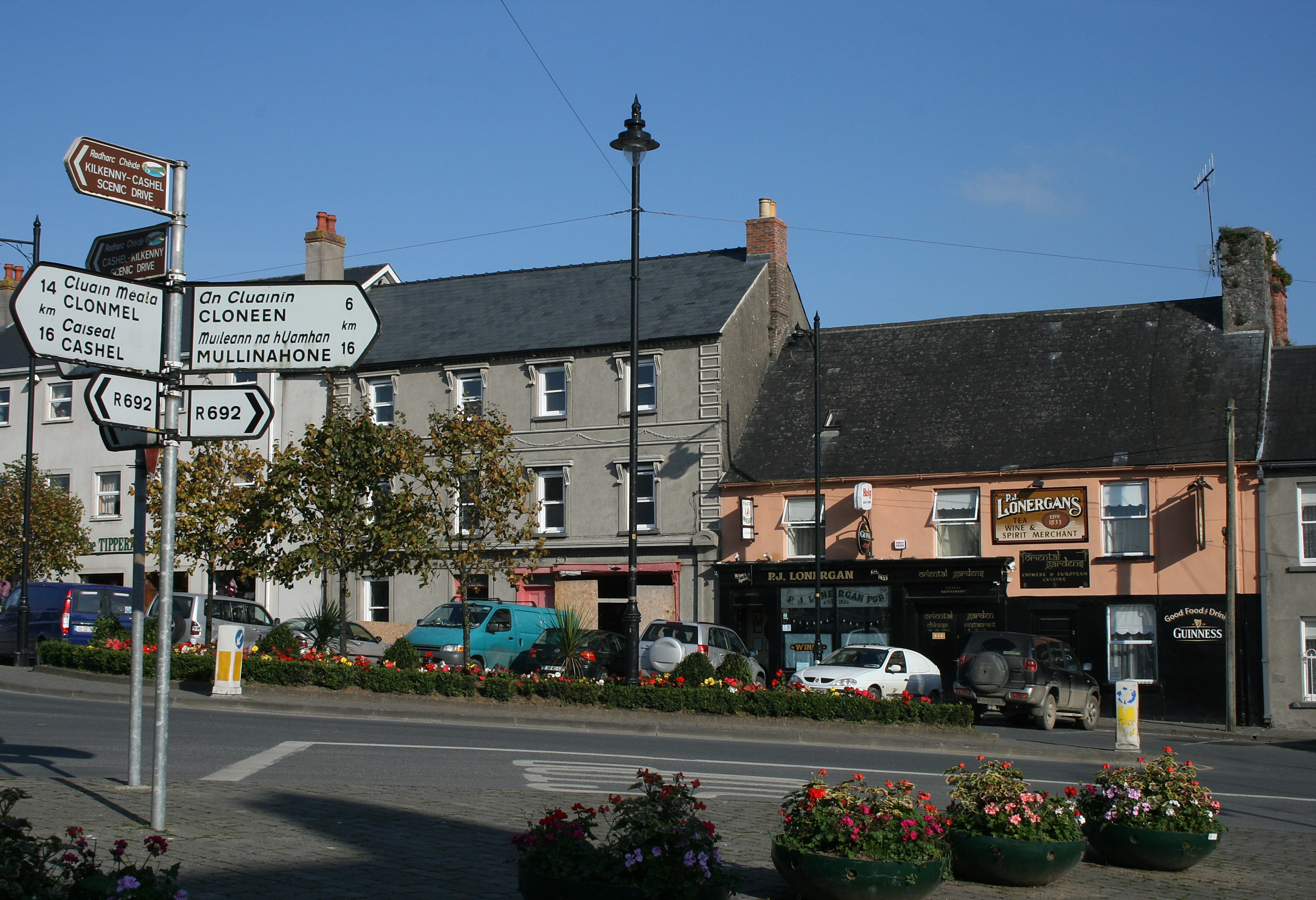
- Town centre

- Location in Ireland
- Coordinates: 52.465°N 7.696°W
- Country: Ireland
- Province: Munster
- County: Tipperary

Area
  - Total: 2.21 km^{2} (0.85 sq mi)
- Elevation: 69 m (226 ft)

Population (2022)
  - Total: 1,738
- Irish Grid Reference: S207355

Historical population
Year	Pop.	±%
1821	2,878	—
1831	3,405	+18.3%
1841	3,915	+15.0%
1851	2,767	−29.3%
1861	2,303	−16.8%
1871	2,106	−8.6%
1881	1,926	−8.5%
1891	1,607	−16.6%
1901	1,498	−6.8%
1911	1,473	−1.7%
1926	1,180	−19.9%
1936	1,112	−5.8%
1946	1,024	−7.9%
1951	984	−3.9%
1956	992	+0.8%
1961	962	−3.0%
1966	997	+3.6%
1971	1,064	+6.7%
1981	1,285	+20.8%
1986	1,391	+8.2%
1991	1,431	+2.9%
1996	1,397	−2.4%
2002	1,388	−0.6%
2006	1,374	−1.0%
2011	1,541	+12.2%
2016	1,545	+0.3%
2022	1,738	+12.5%

Fethard (/ˈfɛθərd/; Irish: Fiodh Ard, meaning 'high wood') is a small town in County Tipperary, Ireland. Dating to the Norman invasion of Ireland, the town's walls were first laid-out in the 13th century, with some sections of these defensive fortifications surviving today.

Fethard is located 16 km (9.9 mi) east of Cashel on the Clashawley River where the R692, R689 and R706 regional roads intersect. It is a civil parish in the barony of Middle Third and in the ecclesiastical parishes of "Fethard and Killusty" of the Roman Catholic Archdiocese of Cashel and Emly, and the "Clonmel Union of Parishes" of the Anglican Diocese of Cashel and Ossory. As of 2022, the town's population was 1,738.

== History ==
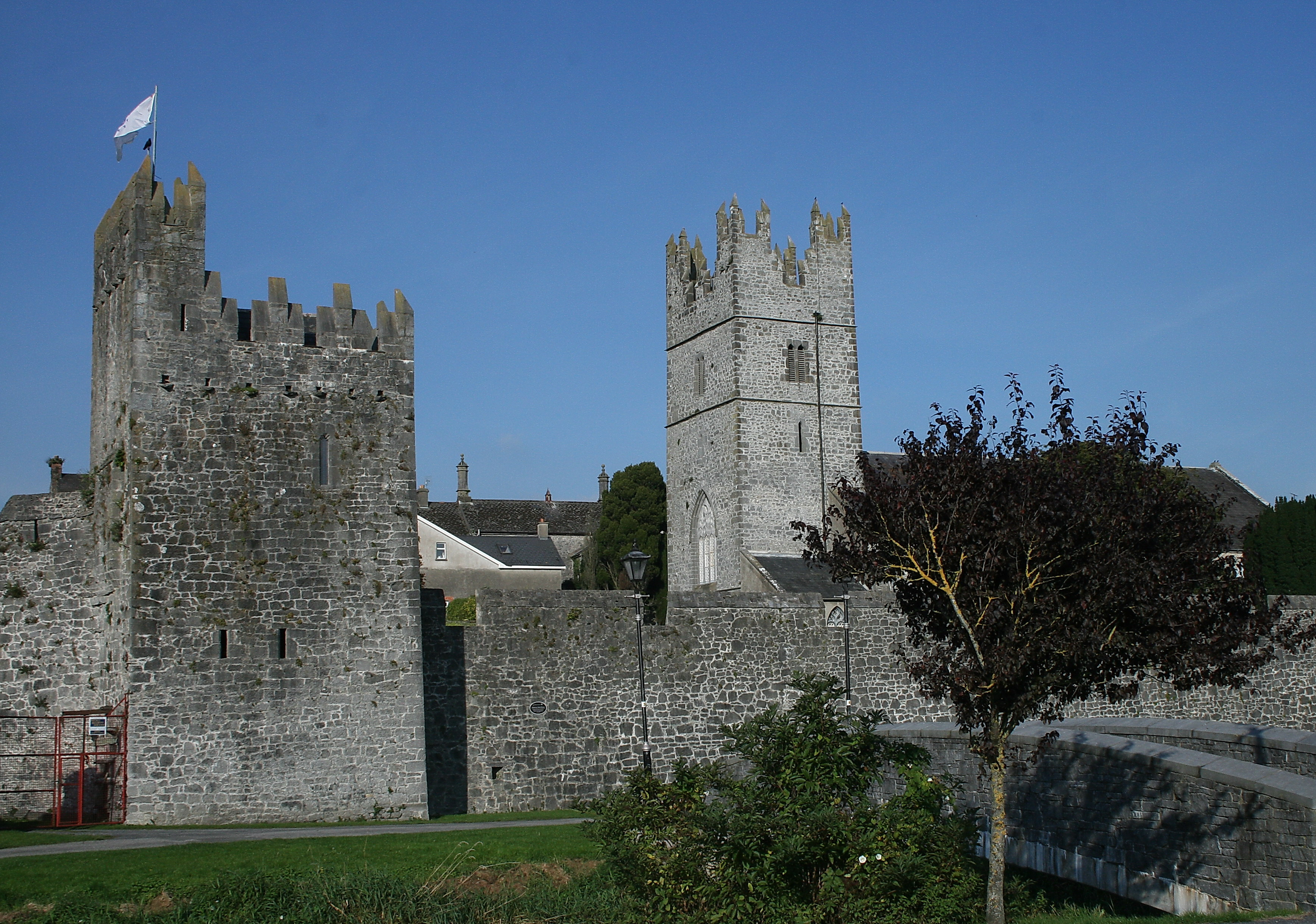
Fethard's walls with mural tower house (at left) and church tower (at right)

Fethard was founded in the early 13th century during the Norman invasion of Ireland. While the low hill, on which the town stands, may have been the location of a pre-Norman church, the first evidence of significant settlement dates from 1201, when a Norman lord, likely William de Braose, settled here.

Fethard was laid-out with a market area, a church and graveyard, and a regular pattern of streets. Its economy was supported by the area's arable farmland. Fethard's founding charter gave it the status of a 'borough' and provided it with a constitution. Under this constitution, the town's people (burgesses) had fixed annual rents, access to a court, and defined fines for certain offences.

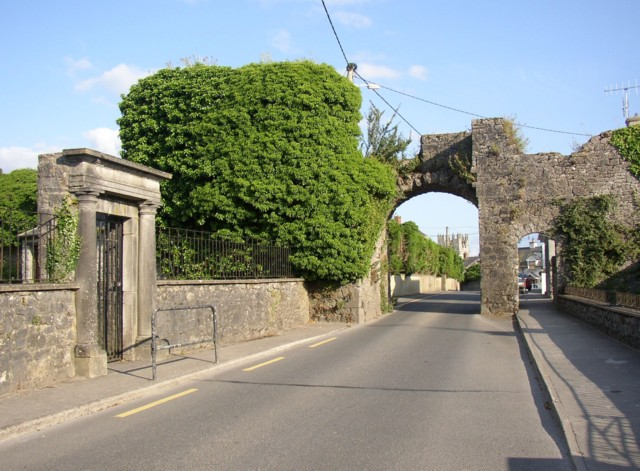
North Gate

The town and lands of Fethard passed out of William de Braose's hands in 1208 following a dispute with King John. In 1215 Fethard was granted to the archbishops of Cashel, and it remained part of the archepiscopal estates until the 16th century. At the start of the 14th century, an Augustinian Friary was established outside the town.

Because of some lawlessness in the town's hinterland (marked, for example, when the nearby woods of Thomas de St Aubin were cleared because some travelling merchants had been robbed or killed), defensive walls were built around Fethard and other towns in the area. The first reference to the walling of Fethard dates to 1292 when the king allowed levies to be applied (over seven years) on items sold in the town, with the collected funds allocated to "the inclosing of their vill and the greater security of Ireland". Records of money still being collected (to fund wall building) date to the 14th century, with another grant issued for Fethard in 1375. This grant specified that stone walls were to be built, suggesting that the earlier town walls were made of earth and timber.

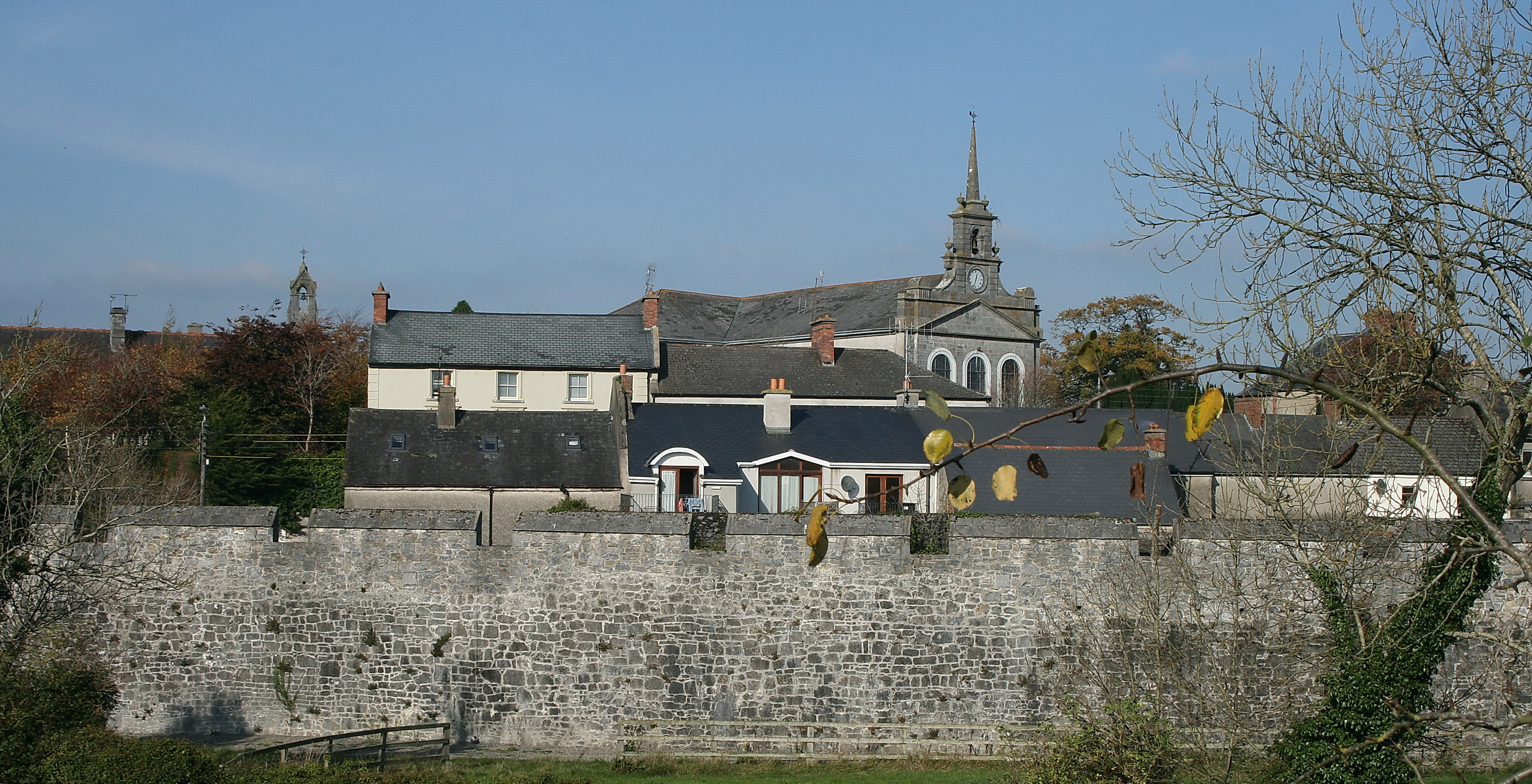
Defensive wall along the northern bank of the Clashawley River

The town received a royal charter from Edward VI in 1552–3, allowing it a corporation in perpetuity, composed of one Sovereign, one Provost, Burgesses and inhabitants. The next royal charter was issued in 1608. A figure in the attainment of this second charter was Sir John Everard. John Everard, a lawyer and member of a local landed family, served the Butler clan and Earl of Ormond. His performances as a justice in the Earl's liberty of Tipperary saw him appointed by Elizabeth I as Second Justice of the Court of King's Bench (Ireland) in 1602. Although the Everards were Catholic, John Everard (by this time "Sir" John Everard) pledged allegiance to the Crown, and when he surrendered all his property to the Crown in 1607, it was immediately granted back to him. His good favour with the Crown was a factor in Fethard attaining a new charter in 1608.

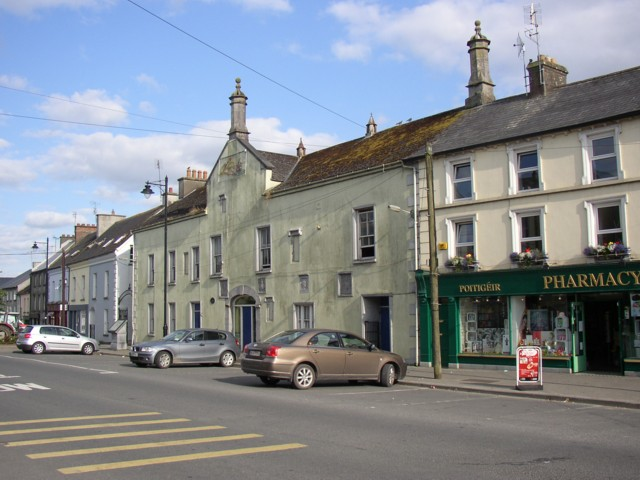
Fethard Town Hall, built as an almshouse c. 1610

In the new charter, the town was described as "a place of strength surrounded with a fair strong wall", and under its terms, the town's corporation was renewed and enlarged. The Fethard corporation was directed to build "a Tholsel (common Hall) for assemblies"; this led to the construction of some almshouses, which developed to become Fethard Town Hall.

During the 17th century, the town was subject to two significant threats. The first was by the army of Murrough O'Brien, 1st Earl of Inchiquin, and followed his Sacking of Cashel in 1647. When news of the massacre at Cashel reached Fethard, its citizens submitted to Inchiquin. Three years later, in 1650, Oliver Cromwell marched on Fethard on his way to besiege and take Kilkenny. In a letter, Cromwell described Fethard as "having a very good wall with round and square bulwarks, after the old manner of fortification". Referring to the nearby Augustinian Friary, he wrote that he had stationed troops "in an old abbey in the suburbs". As with Inchiquin, the citizens of Fethard also agreed to terms of surrender with Cromwell.

By the 18th century, some parts of the town were in a state of decay, with the corporation's books for 1718 noting that 56 people had houses with dangerous chimneys. In the same period, the Everard family's involvement with Fethard came to an end when the last Baronet, Sir Redmond Everard, 4th Baronet, who lived in France, sold his family's properties in Fethard in 1725. The new landowner, Mr Barton (a wine merchant from Bordeaux), replaced the old Everard mansion with a new house, which in turn became a military barracks early in the 19th century.

During the 19th century, the remaining medieval fabric of the town was largely demolished, with all but one of the town's gates removed. The west tower of the Augustinian Friary was removed in 1835.

Despite some demolition works, much of the town's defensive walls remain, making it one of the "best example[s] of a medieval walled town in Ireland". In some areas the remaining walls rise to a height of 7.8 metres (26 ft).

== Economy ==
According to Tipperary County Council's 2017 "Settlement Plan for Fethard", the economy and employment within the town are "linked deeply with the heritage of the Town, the surrounding agricultural hinterlands and the equine industry". Heritage tourism marketing for the area focuses on the town's medieval defensive walls and the area's association with horse-racing and breeding.

== Sport ==
The town is also known in the thoroughbred horse racing industry as the home of Coolmore Stud and of the stables of Michael "Mouse" Morris. McCarthy's Hotel was the home of Dick McCarthy, a professional jockey of the early 20th century, who rode Savernake in the 1930 Grand National.

Fethard GAA Club plays at Fethard GAA Park, formerly known as the Barrack Field. The club holds 21 senior county Gaelic football titles, more than any other team in the county.

Fethard Town Park, a multipurpose sport campus of 26 acres, holds full-size floodlit 4G and grass pitches, dressing rooms, a gym, café, a walking track, car park and community pavilion.

== Transport ==
The Thurles-Clonmel bus route, operated by Bernard Kavanagh & Sons, serves Fethard.

The nearest train stations include Clonmel railway station (approximately 13 kilometres away) and Thurles railway station (approximately 30 kilometres from Fethard).

== Culture ==
The Fethard Medieval Festival takes place annually in June. A parade runs through the main street that culminates in Valley Park centred on the River Clashawley, next to the town's medieval walls. Activities in the festival include amusements, workshops, craft demonstrations, archery, live music, and food stalls.

Fethard was used as a location for the 2011 film Stella Days, based on a book by Michael Doorley about life in Borrisokane during the 1950s.

== Notable people ==
- Thomas Francis Bourke (1840-1889), Fethard-born Irish soldier who fought for the Confederacy in the American Civil War and was later a figure in the Fenian Brotherhood.
- Thomas Bray, Archbishop of Cashel (1792–1820)
- John Butler, 12th Baron Dunboyne was buried in the Augustinian friary, Fethard
- John J. Cantwell, Archbishop of Los Angeles, attended the Patrician Brothers Monastery National School, and the nearby Classical Academy
- John Magnier, owner of Coolmore Stud, is based in Fethard
- Mouse Morris, Irish racehorse trainer, is based in Fethard
- Patrick Mary O'Donnell, Archbishop of Brisbane, Australia (1965–73), born in Fethard
- George Plant (1904-1942), Irish Republican Army member executed in 1942.
- William Tirry (1609–1654), executed during the Cromwellian conquest of Ireland and buried in the former Augustinian Priory at Fethard, he was beatified by Pope John Paul II in 1992 as one of the Irish Catholic Martyrs.

== See also ==
- List of towns and villages in County Tipperary
- Fethard (County Tipperary) (Parliament of Ireland constituency)
- Kiltinan Castle
