= List of Irish regions by Human Development Index =

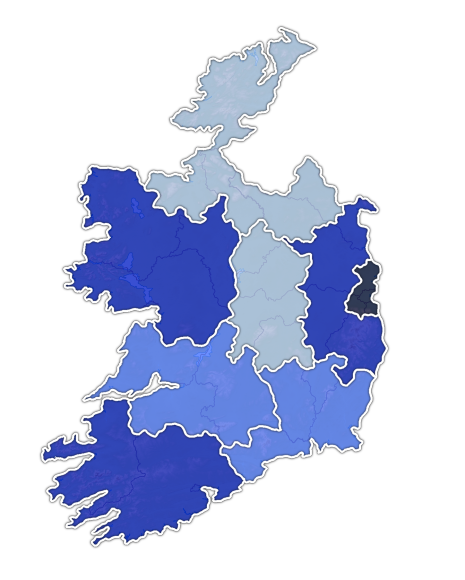
Map of the Ireland regions by Human Development Index in 2021 Legend: > 0.950 0.930 – 0.950 0.920 – 0.930 0.900 – 0.920

This is a list of NUTS3 statistical regions of Ireland by Human Development Index as of 2024 with data for the year 2022.

Rank	Region	HDI (2022)
Very high Human Development
1	Dublin (Dublin, Dún Laoghaire–Rathdown, Fingal, South Dublin)	0.954
2	South-West (Cork and Kerry)	0.950
–	Ireland (average)	0.950
3	West (Galway, Mayo, Roscommon)	0.943
3	Mid-East (Kildare, Louth, Meath, Wicklow)	0.943
5	Mid-West (Clare, Limerick, Tipperary)	0.938
6	South-East (Carlow, Kilkenny, Waterford, Wexford)	0.932
7	Midland (Laois, Longford, Offaly, Westmeath)	0.916
8	Border (Cavan, Donegal, Leitrim, Monaghan, Sligo)	0.915
