= Eastern and Midland Region =

NUTS 2 region in Ireland

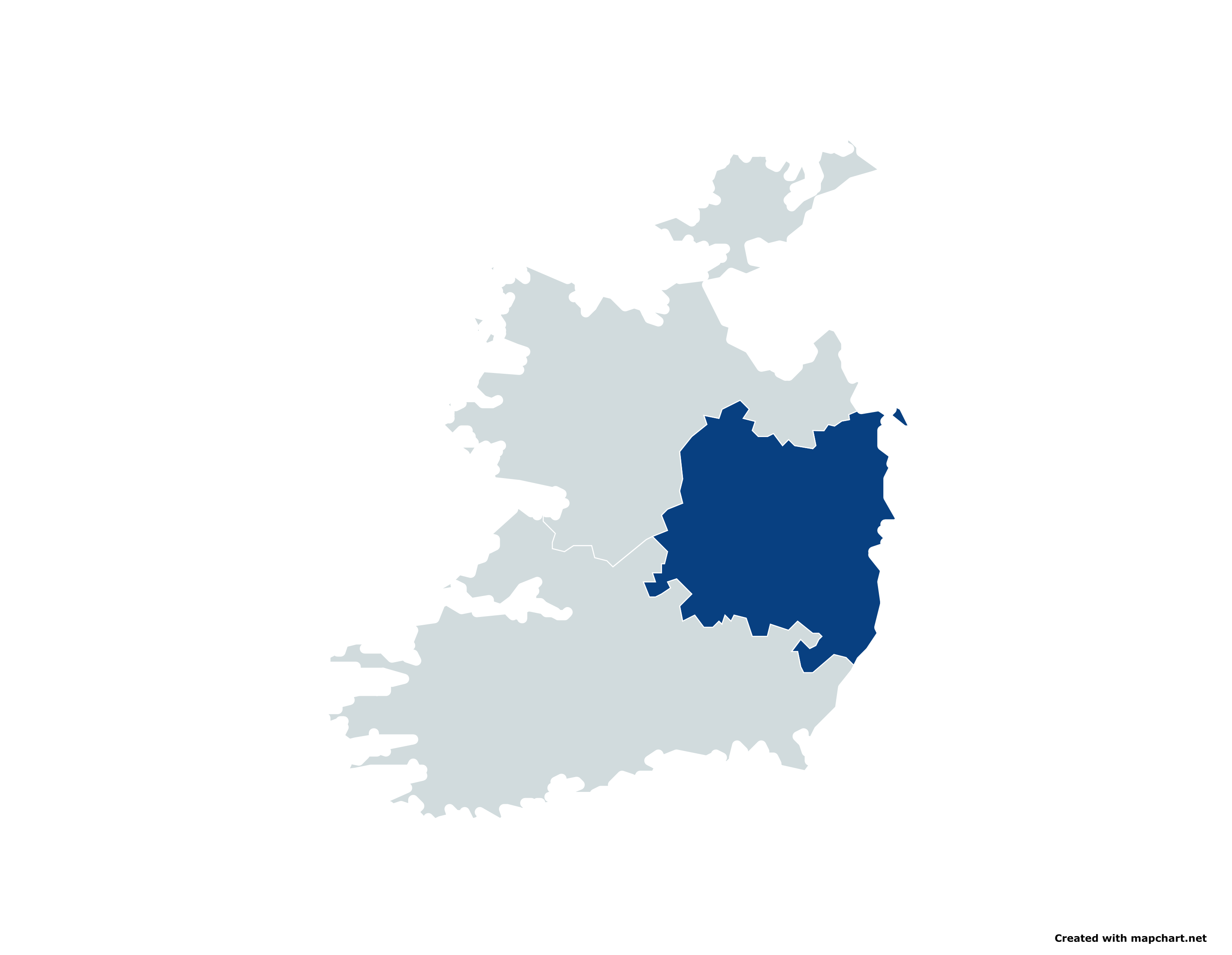
- Eastern and Midland Region in blue
- Interactive map of Eastern and Midland Region
- Coordinates: 53.5857°N 6.9437°W
- Country: Ireland

Area
  - Total: 14,464 km^{2} (5,585 sq mi)

Population (2022)
  - Total: 2,540,307
  - Density: 175.63/km^{2} (454.88/sq mi)

GDP
  - Total: €335.539 billion (2024)
  - Per capita: €125,435 (2024)
- Website: Official website

Eastern and Midland Region is a subdivision of Ireland as defined by the Nomenclature of Territorial Units for Statistics (NUTS). It is one of the three classified NUTS-2 statistical regions of Ireland. The region incorporates the eastern parts of the country, and incorporates 12 counties across the Mid-East, Midlands, and Dublin regions. With a population of more than 2.5 million, and it is the most populated of the three regions of Ireland. With a high HDI, the region is classified as one of the more developed regions in the European Union.

== Classification ==
The country of Ireland is organized into eight regions for administrative purposes. The Nomenclature of Territorial Units for Statistics (NUTS) organizes the country into three broader level sub-divisions. These are classified as a NUTS-2 statistical regions of Ireland, and incorporate one or more of the eight regions within it. The regions form the NUTS-3 territorial units under them.

NUTS 2 Regions may be classified as less developed, transition or more developed to determine eligibility for funding under the European Regional Development Fund and the European Social Fund Plus. In 2021, the Eastern and Midland Region was classified as a more developed region. With a high HDI, the region is classified as one of the more developed regions in the European Union.

== Geography ==
Eastern and Midlands region incorporates the eastern parts of the country, encompassing an area of 14,464 km^{2} (5,585 sq mi). The region is located in the British Isles in Western Europe. The region shares international land borders with Northern Ireland of the United Kingdom, and borders the other two regions (Northern and Western and Southern Region) of Ireland to the west and south respectively. It has a long coastline along the Irish Sea. The topography of the region consists of mountainous terrain in the south, with plains up north.

== Administration ==
The Eastern and Midland Regional Assembly is composed of members nominated by the local authorities in the region. It is one of three Regional Assemblies in Ireland which were established in 2015 following an amendment to the Local Government Act 1991, replacing 8 Regional Authorities with 3 Regional Assemblies.

The Southern Ireland region incorporates 12 counties across the Mid-East, Midlands, and Dublin regions.

| SPA | NUTS 3 Code | Local government areas | EMRA members | Population (2022) |
|---|---|---|---|---|
| Dublin | IE061 | Dublin City | 7 | 592,713 |
| Dublin | IE061 | Dún Laoghaire–Rathdown | 3 | 233,860 |
| Dublin | IE061 | Fingal | 3 | 330,506 |
| Dublin | IE061 | South Dublin | 3 | 301,075 |
| Mid-East | IE062 | County Kildare | 3 | 247.774 |
| Mid-East | IE062 | County Louth | 2 | 139,703 |
| Mid-East | IE062 | County Meath | 3 | 220,826 |
| Mid-East | IE062 | County Wicklow | 3 | 155,851 |
| Midlands | IE063 | County Laois | 2 | 91,877 |
| Midlands | IE063 | County Longford | 2 | 46,751 |
| Midlands | IE063 | County Offaly | 2 | 83,150 |
| Midlands | IE063 | County Westmeath | 2 | 96,221 |
| Total | | | 35 | 2,540,307 |

== See also ==
- Ireland's Ancient East
