= Regional assembly (Ireland) =

Regional assemblies in Ireland took their current form in 2015. They were established under the Local Government Act 1991, as amended by the Local Government Reform Act 2014. They have two main functions under this statute: to promote the co-ordination of public service provision and to monitor the delivery of European Structural and Investment Funds in the regions.

The regional assemblies replaced regional authorities, which had been established under the Local Government Act 1991 as enacted and came into existence in 1994. From 1999 to 2014, there were two regional assemblies, which existed above the Regional Authority structure.

== Current regional assemblies ==
Following an amendment to the Local Government Act 1991 by the Local Government Reform Act 2014, the Regional Authorities were abolished and replaced by two regional assemblies in June 2014. Following a further adjustment, from 1 January 2015, there were three regional assemblies, each divided into Strategic Planning Committees. There are 3 regions, each of which is a NUTS 2 statistical region of Ireland. The regions are divided into strategic planning areas (SPAs), which are NUTS 3 statistical regions, roughly corresponding with the former regions under the Regional Authority system.

The areas of the regional assemblies:

Regional assembly	Strategic planning area	Local authorities
Northern and Western Regional Assembly	Border	Cavan, Donegal, Leitrim, Monaghan, Sligo
Northern and Western Regional Assembly	West	Mayo, Roscommon, Galway and Galway City
Southern Regional Assembly	Mid-West	Clare, Tipperary, Limerick City & County
Southern Regional Assembly	South-East	Carlow, Kilkenny, Wexford, Waterford City & County
Southern Regional Assembly	South-West	Kerry, Cork and Cork City
Eastern and Midland Regional Assembly	Dublin	Dublin City, Dún Laoghaire–Rathdown, Fingal and South Dublin
Eastern and Midland Regional Assembly	Eastern	Kildare, Louth, Meath and Wicklow
Eastern and Midland Regional Assembly	Midland	Laois, Longford, Offaly and Westmeath

== Membership ==
The members of the Regional Assemblies are nominated from the elected members of the local authorities in the region.

== Former regional authorities and regional assemblies ==
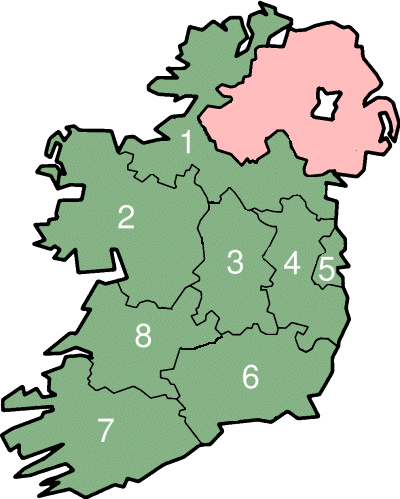
The eight former Regional Authorities of Ireland: 1. Border Regional Authority; 2. West Regional Authority; 3. Midlands Regional Authority; 4. Mid-East Regional Authority; 5. Dublin Regional Authority; 6. South-East Regional Authority; 7. South-West Regional Authority; 8. Mid-West Regional Authority

The Regional Authorities were established in 1994. In 1999, this structure was supplemented with the addition of regional assemblies.

Regional assembly area	Regional authority area	Area
Border, Midland and Western	Border	County Cavan, County Donegal, County Leitrim, County Louth, County Monaghan and County Sligo
Border, Midland and Western	Midlands	County Laois, County Longford, County Offaly and County Westmeath
Border, Midland and Western	West	County Galway, County Mayo, County Roscommon and Galway City
Southern and Eastern	Dublin	Dublin City, Dún Laoghaire–Rathdown, Fingal and South Dublin
Southern and Eastern	Mid-East	County Kildare, County Meath and County Wicklow
Southern and Eastern	Mid-West	County Clare, County Limerick, Limerick City and North Tipperary
Southern and Eastern	South-East	County Carlow, County Kilkenny, County Waterford, County Wexford, South Tipperary and Waterford City
Southern and Eastern	South-West	Cork City, County Cork and County Kerry

The financing of the activities of the Regional Authorities was largely borne by their constituent local authorities. To assist the Regional Authority in undertaking its functions, each has an Operational Committee and an EU Operational Committee. The Operational Committee is chaired by the Cathaoirleach (Chairperson) of the Regional Authority and is composed of senior management from the constituent local authorities and other relevant public sector agencies operating in the region. It helps prepare the work of the Regional Authority and assists and advises it on matters relating to its functions. Also, each Regional Authority has a designated city/county manager (chief executive of a local authority) from one of its local authorities to further enhance the linkages between the local authorities and the Regional Authority.

Each local authority had a certain number of seats on a Regional Authority, based loosely on the population of the local authority area. The size of the Regional Authorities varied from 21 members in the Mid-East region to 37 members in the Border region.

The EU Operational Committee has a similar, but broader, composition and assists the Regional Authority in matters relating to EU assistance and reviewing the implementation of various EU Operational Programmes in a region.

Each Regional Authority had a Director, assisted by a number of policy and administrative staff.

The Regional Authorities had specific responsibility for:

- Reviewing the Development Plans of local authorities in their region and in adjoining regions;
- Preparing Regional Planning Guidelines and Regional Economic and Social Strategies;
- Promoting cooperation, joint actions, arrangements and consultation among local authorities and other public bodies.

On 1 June 2014, the functions of the Regional Authorities were transferred to the two regional assemblies as established in 1999, to create a single regional system. From 1 January 2015, these were replaced by three regional assemblies, with the former regional authority regions being succeeded by strategic planning areas, wholly within the regional assemblies.
