= IETA =

IETA may refer to:

- County Tipperary, county in Ireland (ISO 3166-2 code IE-TA)
- Ingénieur des études et techniques de l'armement, military occupational branch of the French military
- International Emissions Trading Association, international association for the establishment of trading in greenhouse gas emissions by businesses
