= Northwestern Region =

Northwestern Region may refer to

- Northwestern Region (Iceland), traditional region of Iceland
- Northern & Western Region, statistical region of Ireland

== See also ==
- Ilocos Region, northern region of city of Luzon, Philippines
