= West Region, Ireland =

Strategic planning area and NUTS Region in Ireland

West
- The West of Ireland with each local government area highlighted.
- Country: Ireland
- Region: Northern and Western

The West is a strategic planning area within the Northern and Western Region in Ireland. It is a NUTS Level III statistical region of Ireland (coded IE042) under the Eurostat classification. It consists of the counties of Galway, Mayo and Roscommon, and the city of Galway. The West spans 13,801 km^{2} (20% of the total area of the state) and as of the 2022 census has a population of 485,966.

The region is located on the western seaboard of Ireland with the Atlantic Ocean to the west and the River Shannon delimiting the region to the east. The West Region is largely rural, with only 30% of its population living in urban areas. It is noted for its continuance of Irish traditions, such as the Irish language in the region's Gaeltacht areas.

== Regional Assembly ==
The constituent local authorities are the councils of the counties of Galway, Mayo and Roscommon and the city Galway, which each send representatives to the Northern and Western Regional Assembly, forming the West Strategic Planning Area Committee.

=== Former Regional Authority ===
From 1994 to 2014, the West Region was administered by the West Regional Authority, which consisted of 28 elected representatives including the region's representative on the European Union Committee of the Regions. These representatives met once a month and were nominated from the four administrative councils of the region:

- Galway City Council (6)
- Galway County Council (7)
- Mayo County Council (7)
- Roscommon County Council (6)

In 2014, the Regional Authorities were dissolved and their functions were transferred to the Regional Assemblies.

== Demographics ==
According to the 2022 census, the region had a population of 485,966, which constitutes 9.43% of the national population. Its population density was 35 persons per km^{2}. The population of the regional capital, Galway City, was 85,910.

== Economy ==
According to Eurostat figures for 2012, the region has GDP of €13.802 bn and a GDP per capita of €31,500.

Tourism in the region is bolstered by its geography, with it attracting tourists from across Ireland and elsewhere, with inland rivers, lakes, mountains and plains, along with off shore islands, a large number of beaches, and its rugged coastline amongst natural attractions.

== Transport ==
The Ireland West Airport is an international airport in the region which is served by flights to the United Kingdom, and continental Europe. Mainline rail services operate from both Galway and Mayo to Dublin. The M6 motorway, connecting Galway to Dublin, was completed in 2009. The M18 motorway from Shannon to the M6 opened in 2010 and its short continuation north to Tuam (as the M17 motorway) opened in 2017.

The Western Railway Corridor re-opened in 2010 as far as Athenry, a junction with the Dublin-Galway line.

== Urban areas ==
A list of the largest urban areas in the West Region. County capitals are shown in bold.

Rank	Town	County	Population (2022 census)
1	**Galway**	Galway	85,910
2	**Castlebar**	Mayo	13,054
3	Ballina	Mayo	10,556
4	Tuam	Galway	9,647
5	Westport	Mayo	6,872
6	Ballinasloe	Galway	6,597
7	**Roscommon**	Roscommon	6,555
8	Loughrea	Galway	6,322
9	Oranmore	Galway	5,819
10	Athenry	Galway	4,603
11	Claremorris	Mayo	3,857
12	Ballinrobe	Mayo	3,148
13	Boyle	Roscommon	2,915
