= NUTS statistical regions of Ireland =

Statistical regions of Ireland

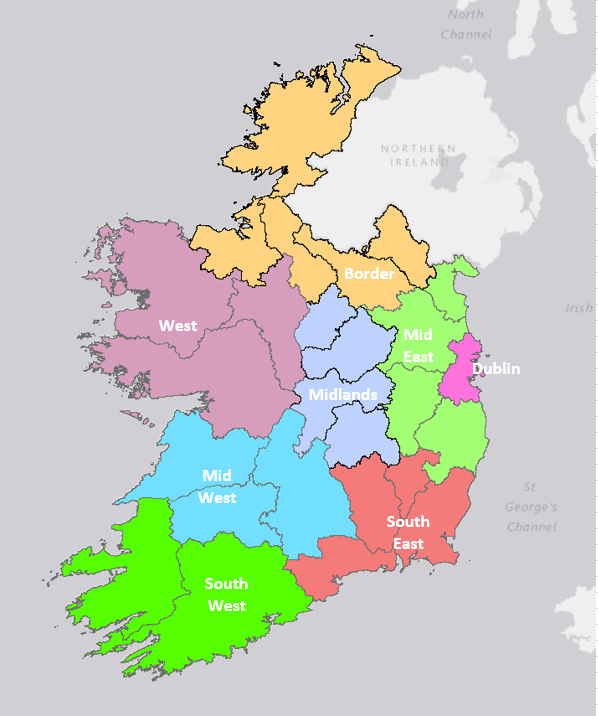
NUTS 3 Regions of Ireland

Ireland uses the Nomenclature of Territorial Units for Statistics (NUTS) geocode standard for referencing country subdivisions for statistical purposes. The standard is developed and regulated by the European Union. The NUTS standard is instrumental in delivering European Structural and Investment Funds. The NUTS code for Ireland is IE and a hierarchy of three levels is established by Eurostat. A further level of geographic organisation, the local administrative unit (LAU), in Ireland is the local electoral area.

== Overview ==
Level	Subdivisions
NUTS 1	1
NUTS 2 statistical regions	3
NUTS 3 statistical regions	8
Local administrative units	166

== NUTS levels 1, 2 and 3 ==
The most recent revision of NUTS regions was made in 2016 and took effect in 2018. The eligibility of regions for funding under the European Regional Development Fund and the European Social Fund Plus was revised in 2021. NUTS 2 Regions may be classified as less developed regions, transition regions, or more developed regions.

NUTS 1	Code	NUTS 2	Code	Status	NUTS 3	Code	Local government areas
Éire / Ireland	IE0	Northern and Western Region	IE04	Transition	Border	IE041	Cavan, Donegal, Leitrim, Monaghan, Sligo
Éire / Ireland	IE0	Northern and Western Region	IE04	Transition	West	IE042	Mayo, Roscommon, Galway and Galway City
Éire / Ireland	IE0	Southern Region	IE05	More developed	Mid-West	IE051	Clare, Tipperary, Limerick City and County
Éire / Ireland	IE0	Southern Region	IE05	More developed	South-East	IE052	Carlow, Kilkenny, Wexford, Waterford City and County
Éire / Ireland	IE0	Southern Region	IE05	More developed	South-West	IE053	Kerry, Cork and Cork City
Éire / Ireland	IE0	Eastern and Midland Region	IE06	More developed	Dublin	IE061	Dublin City, Dún Laoghaire–Rathdown, Fingal and South Dublin
Éire / Ireland	IE0	Eastern and Midland Region	IE06	More developed	Mid-East	IE062	Kildare, Meath, Wicklow, Louth
Éire / Ireland	IE0	Eastern and Midland Region	IE06	More developed	Midland	IE063	Laois, Longford, Offaly, Westmeath

=== Demographic statistics by NUTS 3 region ===
Region	Population (2022)	Area (km^{2})	Population density	% of population
Border	417,260	11,516	36	8.14%
West	483,677	14,289	34	9.44%
Mid-West	500,524	10,511	48	9.77%
South-East	456,228	7,198	63	8.9%
South-West	736,489	12,312	60	14.37%
Dublin	1,450,701	926	1,567	28.31%
Mid-East	761,858	6,891	111	14.87%
Midland	316,799	6,651	48	6.18%
Ireland	5,123,536	70,294	73	100%

== Local administrative units ==
The local administrative units in Ireland are the local electoral areas. These are subdivisions of local government areas used for local elections. In counties outside Dublin and in the cities and counties, they also form the basis of municipal districts within local authorities.

== Regional Assemblies ==
Each of the three NUTS 2 regions has a Regional Assembly. These are divided into strategic planning areas, which correspond to the NUTS 3 regions. Prior to 2014, the eight NUTS 3 regions had Regional Authorities. The 2014 act abolished these and transferred their functions to the Regional Assemblies. Assembly members are nominated by constituent local authorities from among their elected councillors.

== See also ==
- ISO 3166-2 codes of Ireland
- FIPS region codes of Ireland
- List of Irish regions by Human Development Index
- Local government in the Republic of Ireland

== Sources ==
- LAU codes
- Hierarchical list of the Nomenclature of territorial units for statistics - NUTS and the Statistical regions of Europe
- Overview map of EU Countries - NUTS level 1
  - NUTS Maps 2016
- Correspondence between the NUTS levels and the national administrative units
