= 2022 census of Ireland =

Irish population census in 2022

Census 2022
- 3 April 2022

General information
- Country: Ireland
- Topics: Census topics: Population change; Geographical distribution; Age and sex composition; Households and families; Diversity; Ethnicity and Irish Travellers; The Irish language; Religion; Housing; Commuting
- Authority: Central Statistics Office
- Website: https://www.census.ie

Results
- Total population: 5,149,139 (8.1%▲)
- Most populous county: Dublin (1,458,154)
- Least populous county: Leitrim (35,199)

The 2022 census of Ireland was held on Sunday, 3 April 2022. It was organised by the Central Statistics Office (CSO) and reported a total population of 5,149,139, or an 8.1% increase since the prior 2016 census. It is the highest population recorded in a census since 1841 and the first time the population exceeded five million since 1851. The census results were released gradually between May and December 2023 in a series of reports organised either as summaries or in-depth results of specific themes, like age, ethnicity, or religion.

A census was originally planned for 18 April 2021, but was postponed due to the COVID-19 pandemic.

== Background ==
On 15 September 2020, the Irish government postponed the planned 2021 census on advice from the CSO, citing concerns for public health, the health of CSO staff, and the census response rate, all pertaining to the COVID-19 pandemic in Ireland.

The CSO hired 5,100 enumerators, supported by 466 field supervisors, who reported in turn to 46 regional supervisors.

== Census form ==
Preparation of the 2022 census form began in 2017 with a public consultation process drawing input from various governmental departments, interest groups, and academics. The consultation was organised by the Census Advisory Group between October and November 2017, assessing over 400 submissions which informed a test survey of revised and new questions in September 2018. The consultation process led to the inclusion of 8 new questions, which covered topics like ownership of renewable energy sources, working from home, and smoking habits. Additionally, all 25 questions used in the 2016 and 2011 censuses were revised.

The 2022 form was also the first to include a 'time capsule' section, offering a space for respondents to write a voluntary message to remain sealed for 100 years due to data protection requirements.

In February 2021, the CSO confirmed it was researching possible questions to record gender identities, but that no such question would appear on the 2022 census form, which will only ask respondents for their sex with the options 'male' or 'female'. The decision was criticised by multiple LGBT groups and advocates.

== Results ==
The preliminary results were released on 23 June 2022, showing a national population of five million for the first time since 1851. Results published on 30 May 2023 found that Catholicism dropped to 69%, down from 79% in 2016. It also found the average age of the population increased by 1.4 years since 2016, people who speak the Irish language increased by 6% and approximately a third of all workers worked from home for at least some part of their week.

=== Population by province ===
Province	Flag	Irish name	Population (2022)	Density (km^{2})	Counties
Connacht	Connacht	Connachta; Cúige Chonnacht	589,338	33.3	5
Leinster	Leinster	Laighin; Cúige Laighean	2,870,354	145.0	12
Munster	Munster	Mumhain; Cúige Mumhan	1,373,346	55.6	6
Ulster (part of)	Ulster	Ulaidh; Cúige Uladh	314,076	38.8	3

=== Population by county and region ===
Population by region and local government area
Region/county/city	2022 pop.
Border	419,473
Cavan	81,704
Donegal	167,084
Leitrim	35,199
Monaghan	65,288
Sligo	70,198
Dublin	1,458,154
Dublin city	592,713
Dún Laoghaire–Rathdown	233,860
Fingal	330,506
South Dublin	301,705
Mid-East	764,154
Kildare	247,774
Louth	139,703
Meath	220,826
Wicklow	155,851
Mid-West	505,369
Clare	127,938
Limerick	209,536
Tipperary	167,895
Midland	317,999
Laois	91,877
Longford	46,751
Offaly	83,150
Westmeath	96,221
South-East	457,410
Carlow	61,968
Kilkenny	104,160
Waterford	127,363
Wexford	163,919
South-West	740,614
Cork city	224,004
Cork county	360,152
Kerry	156,458
West	483,941
Galway city	85,910
Galway county	190,541
Mayo	137,231
Roscommon	70,259

== See also ==
- Census tract
- Demographics of the Republic of Ireland
- Irish population analysis
