= Counties of Ireland =

Administrative division of Ireland

Traditional counties of Ireland
- The 32 traditional counties of Ireland
- Location: Ireland (Republic of Ireland and Northern Ireland)
- Found in: Provinces
- Government: County councils (Republic of Ireland)
- Subdivisions: Barony; Civil parish; Townland

The counties of Ireland are historic administrative divisions of the island. They began as Norman structures, and as the powers exercised by the Cambro-Norman barons and the Old English nobility waned over time, new offices of political control were established at a county level. The number of counties varied depending on the time period, however thirty-two is the traditionally accepted and used number.

In 1921, upon the partition of Ireland, six of the traditional counties became part of Northern Ireland. In Northern Ireland, counties ceased to be used for local government in 1973. Districts are instead used. In the Republic of Ireland, some counties have been split, resulting in the creation of new counties: there are currently 26 counties, 3 cities and 2 cities and counties that demarcate areas of local government in the Republic.

== Terminology ==
The word "county" has come to be used in different senses for different purposes. In common usage, it can mean the 32 counties that existed prior to 1838 – the so-called traditional counties, 26 of which are in the Republic of Ireland. The Local Government Acts define counties to include separate counties within the traditional county of Dublin.

In Ireland, the word county nearly always precedes the county name; thus "County Roscommon" in Ireland as opposed to "Roscommon County" in Michigan, United States. The former "King's County" and "Queen's County" were exceptions. These are now County Offaly and County Laois, respectively. The abbreviation Co. is used, as in "Co. Roscommon".

The counties in Dublin created in 1994 often drop the word county entirely, or use it after the name; thus, for example, internet search engines show many more uses, on Irish sites, of "Fingal" than of either "County Fingal" or "Fingal County". Although official guidance does not use the term county as part of its name, the local council uses all three forms.

In informal use, the word county is often dropped except where necessary to distinguish between county and town or city; thus "Offaly" rather than "County Offaly", but "County Antrim" to distinguish it from Antrim town. The synonym shire is not used for Irish counties, although the Marquessate of Downshire was named in 1789 after County Down. (Note: Irish county constituencies at Westminster were written Corkshire, Tipperaryshire, etc. in some official British publications between the Acts of Union 1800 and the Representation of the People (Ireland) Act 1832.)

Parts of some towns and cities were exempt from the jurisdiction of the counties that surrounded them. These towns and cities had the status of a county corporate, often granted by royal charter, which had all the judicial, administrative and revenue-raising powers of the regular counties.

== History ==
=== Pre-Norman divisions of Ireland ===
The political geography of Ireland can be traced with some accuracy from the 6th century. At that time Ireland was divided into a patchwork of petty kingdoms with a fluid political hierarchy which, in general, had three traditional grades of king. The lowest level of political control existed at the level of the túath (pl. túatha). A túath was an autonomous group of people of independent political jurisdiction under a rí túaithe, that is, a local petty king. About 150 such units of government existed. Each rí túaithe was in turn subject to a regional or "over-king" (Irish: ruiri). There may have been as many as 20 genuine ruiri in Ireland at any time.

A "king of over-kings" (Irish: rí ruirech) was often a provincial (Irish: rí cóicid) or semi-provincial king to whom several ruiri were subordinate. No more than six genuine rí ruirech were ever contemporary. Usually, only five such "king of over-kings" existed contemporaneously and so are described in the Irish annals as fifths (Irish: cúigí). The areas under the control of these kings were: Ulster (Irish: Ulaidh), Leinster (Irish: Laighin), Connacht (Irish: Connachta), Munster (Irish: An Mhumhan) and Mide (Irish: An Mhídhe). Later record-makers dubbed them provinces, in imitation of Roman provinces. In the Norman period, the historic fifths of Leinster and Meath gradually merged, mainly due to the impact of the Pale, which straddled both, thereby forming the present-day province of Leinster.

The use of provinces as divisions of political power was supplanted by the system of counties after the Norman invasion. In modern times clusters of counties have been attributed to certain provinces but these clusters have no legal status. They are today seen mainly in a sporting context, as Ireland's four professional rugby teams play under the names of the provinces, and the Gaelic Athletic Association has separate Provincial councils and Provincial championships.

=== Plantagenet era ===
==== Lordships ====
With the arrival of Cambro-Norman knights in 1169, the Anglo-Norman invasion of Ireland commenced. This was followed in 1172 by the invasion of King Henry II of England, commencing English royal involvement.

After his intervention in Ireland, Henry II effectively divided the English colony into liberties also known as lordships. These were effectively palatine counties and differed from ordinary counties in that they were disjoined from the crown and that whoever they were granted to essentially had the same authority as the king and that the king's writ had no effect except a writ of error. This covered all land within the county that was not church land. The reason for the creation of such powerful entities in Ireland was due to the lack of authority the English crown had there.

The same process occurred after the Norman conquest of England where despite there being a strong central government, county palatines were needed in border areas with Wales and Scotland. In Ireland this meant that the land was divided and granted to Richard de Clare and his followers who became lords (and sometimes called earls), with the only land which the English crown had any direct control over being the sea-coast towns and territories immediately adjacent.

Of Henry II's grants, at least three of them—Leinster to Richard de Clare; Meath to Walter de Lacy; Ulster to John de Courcy—were equivalent to palatine counties in their bestowing of royal jurisdiction to the grantees. Other grants include the liberties of Connaught and Tipperary.

==== Division of lordships ====
The English lordships in Ireland (blue) at their greatest extent c. 1250

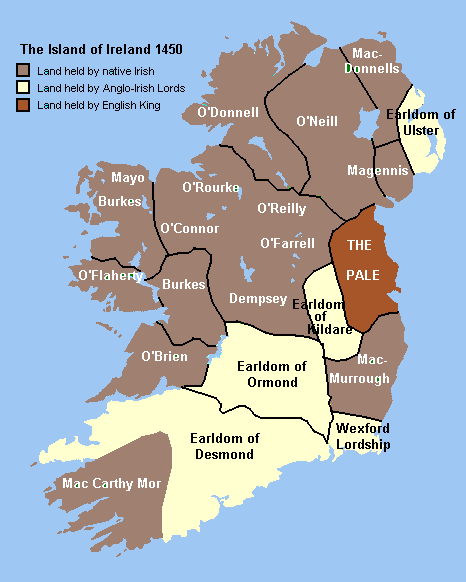
The Pale (grey), earldoms and lordships (blue) in 1450

These initial lordships were later subdivided into smaller "liberties", which appear to have enjoyed the same privileges as their predecessors. The division of Leinster and Munster into smaller counties is commonly attributed to King John, mostly due to a lack of prior documentary evidence, which has been destroyed. However, they may have had an earlier origin. These counties were: in Leinster: Carlow (also known as Catherlogh), Dublin, Kildare, Kilkenny, Louth (also known as Uriel), Meath, Wexford, Waterford; in Munster: Cork, Limerick, Kerry and Tipperary. It is thought that these counties did not have the administrative purpose later attached to them until late in the reign of King John and that no new counties were created until the Tudor dynasty.

The most important office in those that were palatine was that of seneschal. In those liberties that came under Crown control this office was held by a sheriff. The sovereign could appoint sheriffs in palatines. Their power was confined to the church lands, and they became known as sheriffs of a County of the Cross, of which there seem to have been as many in Ireland as there were counties palatine.

The exact boundaries of the liberties and shrievalties appear to have been in constant flux throughout the Plantagenet period, seemingly in line with the extent of English control. For example, in 1297 it is recorded that Kildare had extended to include the lands that now comprise the modern-day counties of Offaly, Laois (Leix) and Wicklow (Arklow). Some attempts had also been made to extend the county system to Ulster.

The Bruce Invasion of Ireland in 1315 resulted in the collapse of effective English rule in Ireland, with the land controlled by the crown continually shrinking to encompass Dublin, and parts of Meath, Louth and Kildare. Throughout the rest of Ireland, English rule was upheld by the earls of Desmond, Ormond, and Kildare (all created in the 14th-century), with the extension of the county system all but impossible. During the reign of Edward III (1327–77) all franchises, grants and liberties had been temporarily revoked with power passed to the king's sheriffs over the seneschals. This may have been due to the disorganisation caused by the Bruce invasion as well as the renouncing of the Connaught Burkes of their allegiance to the crown.

The Earls of Ulster divided their territory up into counties. These are not considered part of the Crown's shiring of Ireland. In 1333, the Earldom of Ulster is recorded as consisting of seven counties: Antrim, Blathewyc, Cragferus, Coulrath, del Art, Dun (also known as Ladcathel), and Twescard.

=== Passage to the Crown ===
Of the original lordships or palatine counties:

- Leinster had passed from Richard de Clare to his daughter, Isabel de Clare, who had married William Marshal, 1st Earl of Pembroke (second creation of title). This marriage was confirmed by King John, with Isabel's lands given to William as consort. The liberty was afterwards divided into five—Carlow, Kildare, Kilkenny, Leix and Wexford—one for each of Marshal's co-heiresses.
- Meath was divided between the granddaughters of Walter de Lacy: Maud and Margery. Maud's half became the liberty of Trim, and she married Geoffrey de Geneville. Margery's half retained the name Meath, and she married John de Verdon. After the marriage of Maud's daughter Joan to Roger Mortimer, 1st Earl of March, Trim later passed via their descendants to the English Crown. Meath, which had passed to the Talbots, was resumed by Henry VIII under the Statute of Absentees.
- Ulster was regranted to the de Lacys from John de Courcy, whilst Connaught, which had been granted to William de Burgh, was at some point divided into the liberties of Connaught and Roscommon. William's grandson Walter de Burgh was in 1264 also made lord of Ulster, bringing both Connaught and Ulster under the same lord. In 1352 Elizabeth de Burgh, 4th Countess of Ulster married Lionel of Antwerp, a son of king Edward III. Their daughter Philippa married Edmund Mortimer, 3rd Earl of March. Upon the death of Edmund Mortimer, 5th Earl of March in 1425, both lordships were inherited by Richard of York, 3rd Duke of York and thus passed to the Crown.
- Tipperary was resumed by King James I. In 1662, under Charles II it was reconstituted for James Butler, 1st Duke of Ormonde.

With the passing of liberties to the Crown, the number of Counties of the Cross declined, and only one, Tipperary, survived into the Stuart era; the others had ceased to exist by the reign of Henry VIII.

=== Tudor era ===
Under the Tudors, specifically the reign of Henry VIII (1509–47), crown control started to again extend throughout Ireland. Having declared himself King of Ireland in 1541, Henry VIII went about converting Irish chiefs into feudal subjects of the crown with land divided into districts, which were eventually amalgamated into the modern counties. County boundaries were still ill-defined; however, in 1543 Meath was split into Meath and Westmeath. Around 1545, the Byrnes and O'Tooles, both native septs who had constantly been a pain for the English administration of the Pale, petitioned the Lord Deputy of Ireland to turn their district into its own county, Wicklow. This was ignored.

During the reigns of the last two Tudor monarchs, Mary I (1553–58) and Elizabeth I (1558–1603), the majority of the work for the foundation of the modern counties was carried out under the auspices of three Lord Deputies: Thomas Radclyffe, 3rd Earl of Sussex, Sir Henry Sydney, and Sir John Perrot.

Mary's reign saw the first addition of actual new counties since the reign of King John. Radclyffe had conquered the districts of Glenmaliry, Irry, Leix, Offaly, and Slewmargy from the O'Moores and O'Connors, and in 1556 a statute decreed that Offaly and part of Glenmaliry would be made into the county of King's County, whilst the rest of Glenmarliry along with Irry, Leix and Slewmargy was formed into Queen's County. Radclyffe brought forth legislation to shire all land as yet unshired throughout Ireland and sought to divide the island into six parts—Connaught, Leinster, Meath, Nether Munster, Ulster, and Upper Munster. His administrative reign in Ireland was cut short, and it was not until the reign of Mary's successor, Elizabeth, that this legislation was re-adopted. Under Elizabeth, Radclyffe was brought back to implement it.

Sydney during his three tenures as Lord Deputy created two presidencies to administer Connaught and Munster. He shired Connaught into the counties of Galway, Mayo, Roscommon, and Sligo. In 1565, the territory of the O'Rourkes within Roscommon was made into the county of Leitrim. In 1569, in an attempt to reduce the importance of the province of Munster, Sydney, using the River Shannon as a natural boundary took the former kingdom of Thomond (North Munster) and made it into the county of Clare as part of the presidency of Connaught.

In 1569, the Irish Parliament passed "An Act for turning of Countries that be not yet Shire Grounds into Shire Grounds". In 1571, a commission headed by Perrot and others declared that the territory of Desmond in Munster was to be made a county of itself, and it had its own sheriff appointed. In 1606, it was merged with the county of Kerry. In 1575, Sydney made an expedition to Ulster to plan its shiring. Nothing came of the plans.

In 1578, the go-ahead was given for turning the districts of the Byrnes and O'Tooles into the county of Wicklow. With the outbreak of war in Munster and then Ulster, they resumed their independence. Sydney also sought to split Wexford into two smaller counties, the northern half of which was to be called Ferns, but the matter was dropped as it was considered impossible to properly administer. In 1583, the territory of the O'Farrells of Annaly, which was in Westmeath, was formed into the county of Longford and transferred to Connaught. The Desmond rebellion (1579–83) that was taking place in Munster stopped Sydney's work. By the time it had been defeated, Sir John Perrot was Lord Deputy, being appointed in 1584.

Perrot was most remembered for shiring Ulster, the only province of Ireland that remained effectively outside of English control Prior to his tenancy the only proper county in Ulster was Louth, which had been part of the Pale. There were two other long recognised entities north of Louth—Antrim and Down—that had at one time been "counties" of the Earldom of Ulster and were regarded as apart from the unreformed parts of the province. The date Antrim and Down became constituted is unknown.

In 1588, Perrot was recalled and for two decades the shiring of Ulster basically existed on paper, as the territory affected remained firmly outside of English control until the defeat of Hugh O'Neill, Earl of Tyrone in the Nine Years' War. These counties were: Armagh, Cavan, Coleraine, Donegal, Fermanagh, Monaghan, and Tyrone. Cavan was formed from the territory of the O'Reilly's of East Breifne and had been transferred from Connaught to Ulster. After O'Neill and his allies fled Ireland in 1607 in the Flight of the Earls, their lands became escheated to the Crown. The county divisions designed by Perrot were used as the basis for the grants of the 1609 Plantation of Ulster effected by King James I..

Around 1600, near the end of Elizabeth's reign, Clare was made an entirely distinct presidency of its own under the Earls of Thomond. It returned to being part of Munster after the Restoration in 1660.

In 1606, Wicklow was shired after the subjugation of the Byrnes and O'Tooles by Lord Deputy Sir Arthur Chichester. This county was one of the last to be created, yet was the closest to the centre of English power in Ireland.

In 1613, County Londonderry was incorporated by the merger of County Coleraine with the barony of Loughinsholin (in County Tyrone), the North West Liberties of Londonderry (in County Donegal), and the North East Liberties of Coleraine (in County Antrim).

=== Demarcation of counties and Tipperary ===
Throughout the Elizabethan era and the reign of her successor James I, the exact boundaries of the provinces and the counties they consisted of remained uncertain. In 1598 Meath is considered a province in Hayne's Description of Ireland, and included the counties of Cavan, East Meath, Longford, and Westmeath. This contrasts to George Carew's 1602 survey where there were only four provinces with Longford part of Connaught and Cavan not mentioned at all with only three counties mentioned for Ulster. During Perrot's tenure as Lord President of Munster before he became Lord Deputy, Munster contained as many as eight counties rather than the six it later consisted of. These eight counties were: the five English counties of Cork, Limerick, Kerry, Tipperary, and Waterford; and the three Irish counties of Desmond, Ormond, and Thomond.

Perrot's divisions in Ulster were for the main confirmed by a series of inquisitions between 1606 and 1610 that settled the demarcation of the counties of Connaught and Ulster. John Speed's Description of the Kingdom of Ireland in 1610 showed that there was still a vagueness over what counties constituted the provinces, however, Meath was no longer reckoned a province. By 1616 when the Attorney General for Ireland Sir John Davies departed Ireland, almost all counties had been delimited. The only exception was the county of Tipperary, which still belonged to the palatinate of Ormond.

Tipperary would remain an anomaly being in effect two counties, one palatine, the other of the Cross until 1715 during the reign of King George I when an act abolished the "royalties and liberties of the County of Tipperary" and "that whatsoever hath been denominated or called Tipperary or Cross Tipperary, shall henceforth be and remain one county forever, under the name of the County of Tipperary." Between 1838 and 2014, County Tipperary was divided into two ridings/counties, North Tipperary and South Tipperary.

=== Sub-divisions of counties ===
To correspond with the subdivisions of the English shires into honours or baronies, Irish counties were granted out to the Anglo-Norman noblemen in cantreds, later known as baronies, which were subdivided, as in England, into parishes. Parishes were composed of townlands. In many cases, these divisions correspond to earlier, pre-Norman, divisions. While there are 331 baronies in Ireland, and more than a thousand civil parishes, there are around sixty thousand townlands that range in size from one to several thousand hectares. Townlands were often traditionally divided into smaller units called quarters, but these subdivisions are not legally defined.

=== Counties corporate ===
The following towns/cities had charters specifically granting them the status of a county corporate:

- County of the Town of Carrickfergus (by 1325)
- County of the City of Cork (1608)
- County of the Town of Drogheda (1412)
- County of the City of Dublin (1548)
- County of the Town of Galway (1610)
- County of the City of Kilkenny (1610)
- County of the City of Limerick (1609)
- County of the City of Waterford (1574)

The only entirely new counties created in 1898 were the county boroughs of Londonderry and Belfast. Carrickfergus, Drogheda and Kilkenny were abolished. Galway was also abolished, but recreated in 1986.

=== Exceptions to the county system of control ===
Regional presidencies of Connacht and Munster remained in existence until 1672, with special powers over their subsidiary counties. Tipperary remained a county palatine until the passing of the County Palatine of Tipperary Act 1715, with different officials and procedures from other counties. At the same time, Dublin, until the 19th century, had ecclesiastical liberties with rules outside those applying to the rest of Dublin city and county. Exclaves of the county of Dublin existed in counties Kildare and Wicklow. At least eight other enclaves of one county inside another, or between two others, existed. The enclaves and exclaves were merged into neighbouring and surrounding counties, primarily in the mid-19th century under a series of Orders in Council.

=== Evolution of functions ===
The Church of Ireland exercised functions at the level of a civil parish that were later exercised by county authorities. Vestigial feudal power structures of major old estates remained well into the 18th century. Urban corporations operated individual royal charters. Management of counties came to be exercised by grand juries. Members of grand juries were the local payers of rates who historically held judicial functions, taking maintenance roles in regard to roads and bridges, and the collection of "county cess" taxes. They were usually composed of wealthy "country gentlemen" (i.e. landowners, farmers and merchants):

A country gentleman as a member of a Grand Jury...levied the local taxes, appointed the nephews of his old friends to collect them, and spent them when they were gathered in. He controlled the boards of guardians and appointed the dispensary doctors, regulated the diet of paupers, inflicted fines and administered the law at petty sessions.

The counties were initially used for judicial purposes, but began to take on some governmental functions in the 17th century, notably with grand juries.

=== 19th and 20th centuries ===
In 1836, the use of counties as local government units was further developed, with grand-jury powers extended under the Grand Jury (Ireland) Act 1836. The traditional county of Tipperary was split into two judicial counties (or ridings) following the establishment of assize courts in 1838. Also in 1838, local poor law boards, with a mix of magistrates and elected "guardians" took over the health and social welfare functions of the grand juries.

In 1898, a more radical reorganisation of local government took place with the passage of the Local Government (Ireland) Act 1898. This Act established a county council for each of the thirty-three Irish administrative counties. Elected county councils took over the powers of the grand juries. The boundaries of the traditional counties changed on a number of occasions. The 1898 Act changed the boundaries of Counties Galway, Clare, Mayo, Roscommon, Sligo, Waterford, Kilkenny, Meath and Louth, and others. County Tipperary was divided into two regions: North Riding and South Riding. Areas of the cities of Belfast, Cork, Dublin, Limerick, Derry and Waterford were carved from their surrounding counties to become county boroughs in their own right and given powers equivalent to those of administrative counties.

Under the Government of Ireland Act 1920, the island was partitioned between Southern Ireland and Northern Ireland. For the purposes of the Act,

... Northern Ireland shall consist of the parliamentary counties of Antrim, Armagh, Down, Fermanagh, Londonderry and Tyrone, and the parliamentary boroughs of Belfast and Londonderry, and Southern Ireland shall consist of so much of Ireland as is not comprised within the said parliamentary counties and boroughs.

The county and county borough borders were used to determine the line of partition. Southern Ireland shortly afterwards became the Irish Free State. This partition was entrenched in the Anglo-Irish Treaty, which was ratified in 1922, by which the Irish Free State left the United Kingdom with Northern Ireland making the decision to not separate two days later.

==== Historic and traditional counties ====
Areas that were shired by 1607 and continued as counties until the local government reforms of 1836, 1898 and 2001 are sometimes referred to as "traditional" or "historic" counties. These were distinct from the counties corporate that existed in some of the larger towns and cities, although linked to the county at large for other purposes. From 1898 to 2001, areas with county councils were known as administrative counties. The counties corporate were designated as county boroughs. From 2001, local government areas were divided between counties and cities. From 2014, they were divided into counties, cities, and cities and counties.

== Current usage ==
=== In the Republic of Ireland ===
In the Republic of Ireland, the traditional counties are, in general, the basis for local government, planning and community development purposes and are still generally respected for other purposes. They are governed by county councils. Administrative borders have been altered to allocate various towns exclusively into one county having been originally split between two counties.

At the establishment of the Irish Free State in 1922, there were 27 administrative counties (with County Tipperary divided into the administrative counties of North Tipperary and South Tipperary) and 4 county boroughs, Dublin, Cork, Limerick and Waterford.

Rural districts were abolished by the Local Government Act 1925 and the Local Government (Dublin) Act 1930 amidst widespread allegations of corruption.

Under the Local Government Provisional Order Confirmation Act 1976, part of the urban area of Drogheda, which lay in County Meath, was transferred to County Louth in January 1977. This resulted in the land area of County Louth increasing slightly at the expense of County Meath. The possibility of a similar action with regard to Waterford City has been raised in recent years, though opposition from Kilkenny has been strong.

In 1985, Galway became a county borough.

County Dublin was abolished as an administrative county in 1994 and divided into three administrative counties: Dún Laoghaire–Rathdown, Fingal, and South Dublin.

Under the Local Government Act 2001, the county boroughs of Dublin, Cork, Galway, Limerick and Waterford were re-styled as cities, with the same status in law as counties. The term administrative county was replaced with the term "county".

The cities of Limerick and Waterford were merged with their respective counties by the Local Government Reform Act 2014, to form new cities and counties. The same Act abolished North Tipperary and South Tipperary and re-established County Tipperary as an administrative unit.

There are now 31 local government areas: 26 counties, three cities, and two cities and counties.

Since 2014, local authorities send representatives to Regional Assemblies overseeing three regions for the purposes of European Structural and Investment Funds: Southern Region, the Eastern and Midland Region, and the Northern and Western Region. From 1994 to 2014, there were eight Regional Authorities, dissolved under the Local Government Reform Act 2014.

As placenames, there is a distinction between the traditional counties, listed as "counties", and those created as local government areas, listed as "administrative counties".

==== Education ====
In 2013 Education and Training Boards (ETBs) were formed throughout the Republic of Ireland, replacing the system of Vocational Education Committees (VECs) created in 1930. Originally, VECs were formed for each administrative county and county borough, and also in a number of larger towns, and were legally sub-committees of the relevant authorities. In 1997 the majority of town VECs were absorbed by the surrounding county authorities. The 33 VEC areas were reduced to 16 ETB areas, with each consisting of one or more local government county or city areas.

The Institute of technology system was organised by committee areas or "functional areas". These areas retain their legal basis but are not as important as originally envisioned as the institutes are now more national in character. The functional areas are only of significance today when selecting governing councils; similarly, Dublin Institute of Technology was originally a group of several colleges within the aegis of the City of Dublin VEC.

==== Elections ====
Where possible, Dáil constituencies follow county boundaries. Under the Electoral Act 1997, as amended, a Constituency Commission is established following the publication of preliminary census figures every five years. The commission is charged with defining constituency boundaries, and the 1997 Act provides that "the breaching of county boundaries shall be avoided as far as practicable". This provision does not apply to the boundaries between cities and counties, or between the three counties in the Dublin area.

This system usually results in more populated counties having several constituencies: Dublin, including Dublin city, is subdivided into twelve constituencies, Cork into five. Smaller counties such as Carlow and Kilkenny or Laois and Offaly may be paired to form constituencies. Leitrim, Ireland's least populated county, was divided between the constituencies of Sligo–North Leitrim and Roscommon–South Leitrim from 2007 to 2016.

Each county, city, and city and county is divided into local electoral areas for the election of councillors. The boundaries of the areas and the number of councillors assigned are fixed from time to time by order of the Minister for Housing, Local Government and Heritage, following a report by the Local Government Commission, and based on population changes recorded in the census.

=== In Northern Ireland ===
In Northern Ireland, a major reorganisation of local government in 1973 replaced the six traditional counties and two county boroughs (Belfast and Derry (Note: The city and county officially named Londonderry are often called Derry. See Derry/Londonderry name dispute.)) with 26 single-tier districts for local government purposes. In 2015, as a result of a reform process that started in 2005, these districts were merged to form 11 new single-tier "super districts".

The six traditional counties remain in use for some purposes, including the three-letter coding of vehicle number plates, the Royal Mail Postcode Address File (which records counties in all addresses although they are no longer required for postcoded mail) and Lord Lieutenancies (for which the former county boroughs are also used). There are no longer official 'county towns'. However, the counties are still very widely acknowledged, for example as administrative divisions for sporting and cultural organisations.

=== Other uses ===
The administrative division of the island along the lines of the traditional 32 counties was also adopted by non-governmental and cultural organisations. In particular, the Gaelic Athletic Association (GAA) continues to organise its activities on the basis of its own system of counties that, throughout the island, correspond almost exactly to the 32 traditional counties in use at the time of the foundation of that organisation in 1884. The GAA also uses the term "county" for some of its organisational units in Britain and further afield. Legal adjustments to county bounds since 1884 have not been reflected in GAA county boards (e.g. Ballaghaderreen GAA which is located in County Roscommon but affiliated to Mayo GAA county board).

== List of counties ==
The 35 divisions listed below include the traditional counties of Ireland as well as three created in Dublin in 1994. Twenty-four counties still delimit the remit of local government areas in the Republic of Ireland, in some cases with slightly redrawn boundaries. County Dublin, which was abolished as a distinct administrative entity in 1994, is included, as are the three new administrative counties which took over the functions of the former County Dublin. In Northern Ireland, the counties listed no longer serve this purpose. The Irish-language names of counties in the Republic of Ireland are prescribed by ministerial order, which in the case of three newer counties, omits the word contae (county). Irish names form the basis for all English-language county names except Waterford, Wexford, and Wicklow, which are of Norse origin.

The "Region" column of the table below, except for the six Northern Ireland counties, indicates Regions as defined under the Local Government Act 1991. These are NUTS 2 statistical regions of Ireland. "County town" is the current or former administrative capital of the county.

The cities of Cork, Dublin, and Galway, which are separate local government areas with the same legal status as counties, are not shown separately. Also omitted are the former county boroughs of Londonderry and Belfast which in Northern Ireland had the same legal status as the six counties until the reorganisation of local government in 1973.

County	Irish name	County town	Most populous city/town	Province	Region
Antrim	Aontroim (Contae Aontroma)	Antrim (traditional), Ballymena (Note: County Antrim's county town was Carrickfergus from 1850 to 1970.) (Council)	Belfast (part)	Ulster	UKN0: Northern Ireland
Armagh	Ard Mhacha (Contae Ard Mhacha)	Armagh	Craigavon	Ulster	UKN0: Northern Ireland
Carlow (Note: Also a local government area.)	Ceatharlach (Contae Cheatharlach)	Carlow		Leinster	IE06: Eastern and Midland
Cavan	An Cabhán (Contae an Chabháin)	Cavan		Ulster	IE04: Northern and Western
Clare	An Clár (Contae an Chláir)	Ennis		Munster	IE05: Southern
Cork	Corcaigh (Contae Chorcaí)	Cork		Munster	IE05: Southern
Donegal	Dún na nGall (Contae Dhún na nGall)	Lifford	Letterkenny	Ulster	IE04: Northern and Western
Down	An Dún (Contae an Dúin)	Downpatrick	Belfast (part)	Ulster	UKN0: Northern Ireland
Dublin	Baile Átha Cliath (Contae Bhaile Átha Cliath)	Dublin		Leinster	IE06: Eastern and Midland
Dún Laoghaire–Rathdown	Dún Laoghaire–Ráth an Dúin	Dún Laoghaire		Leinster	IE06: Eastern and Midland
Fingal	Fine Gall	Swords		Leinster	IE06: Eastern and Midland
South Dublin	Áth Cliath Theas	Tallaght		Leinster	IE06: Eastern and Midland
Fermanagh	Fear Manach (Contae Fhear Manach)	Enniskillen		Ulster	UKN0: Northern Ireland
Galway	Gaillimh (Contae na Gaillimhe)	Galway		Connacht	IE04: Northern and Western
Kerry	Ciarraí (Contae Chiarraí)	Tralee		Munster	IE05: Southern
Kildare	Cill Dara (Contae Chill Dara)	Naas		Leinster	IE06: Eastern and Midland
Kilkenny	Cill Chainnigh (Contae Chill Chainnigh)	Kilkenny		Leinster	IE05: Southern
Laois	Laois (Contae Laoise)	Portlaoise		Leinster	IE06: Eastern and Midland
Leitrim	Liatroim (Contae Liatroma)	Carrick-on-Shannon		Connacht	IE04: Northern and Western
Limerick	Luimneach (Contae Luimnigh)	Limerick		Munster	IE05: Southern
Londonderry	Doire (Contae Dhoire)	Coleraine	Derry	Ulster	UKN0: Northern Ireland
Longford	An Longfort (Contae an Longfoirt)	Longford		Leinster	IE06: Eastern and Midland
Louth	Lú (Contae Lú)	Dundalk	Drogheda	Leinster	IE06: Eastern and Midland
Mayo	Maigh Eo (Contae Mhaigh Eo)	Castlebar		Connacht	IE04: Northern and Western
Meath	An Mhí (Contae na Mí)	Navan (Note: County Meath's former county town was Trim.)		Leinster	IE06: Eastern and Midland
Monaghan	Muineachán (Contae Mhuineacháin)	Monaghan		Ulster	IE04: Northern and Western
Offaly	Uíbh Fhailí (Contae Uíbh Fhailí)	Tullamore (Note: County Offaly's former county town was Philipstown.)		Leinster	IE06: Eastern and Midland
Roscommon	Ros Comáin (Contae Ros Comáin)	Roscommon		Connacht	IE04: Northern and Western
Sligo	Sligeach (Contae Shligigh)	Sligo		Connacht	IE04: Northern and Western
Tipperary	Tiobraid Árann (Contae Thiobraid Árann)	Nenagh (Note: County Tipperary's former county towns were Clonmel and Cashel.)	Clonmel	Munster	IE05: Southern
Tyrone	Tír Eoghain (Contae Thír Eoghain)	Omagh		Ulster	UKN0: Northern Ireland
Waterford	Port Láirge (Contae Phort Láirge)	Waterford		Munster	IE05: Southern
Westmeath	An Iarmhí (Contae na hIarmhí)	Mullingar	Athlone	Leinster	IE06: Eastern and Midland
Wexford	Loch Garman (Contae Loch Garman)	Wexford		Leinster	IE05: Southern
Wicklow	Cill Mhantáin (Contae Chill Mhantáin)	Wicklow	Bray	Leinster	IE06: Eastern and Midland

== See also ==
- Counties of the United Kingdom
- County (Gaelic games)
- History of Ireland
- Vehicle registration plates of the Republic of Ireland
- Vehicle registration plates of Northern Ireland
- List of Irish counties by area
- List of Irish counties by population
- List of Irish counties' coats of arms
- List of Irish county towns
- ISO 3166-2:GB
- ISO 3166-2:IE

== Sources ==
- Falkiner, Caesar Litton (1903). "The Counties of Ireland: An Historical Sketch of Their Origin, Constitution, and Gradual Delimitation". Proceedings of the Royal Irish Academy. XXIV, Section C.
