= Midland Region, Ireland =

NUTS 3 region in Ireland

Coordinates: 53°25′25″N 7°56′33″W

The Midland region of Ireland with each constituent county council highlighted

The Midland Region (coded IE063) is a NUTS Level III statistical region of Ireland. It consists of the territory of the counties of Laois, Offaly, Westmeath and Longford. The Midland Region spans 6,652 km^{2}, 9.5% of the total area of the state and, according to the 2022 census, had a population of 317,999.

Before 2014, the region was governed by the Midland Regional Authority. The Authority was abolished in 2014. Midland now exists as a strategic planning area within the Eastern and Midland Region. The NUTS regions are used for statistical reporting to Eurostat, while the Regional Assemblies are responsible for planning at a local government level.

The Midland Region is also a tourist destination due to its natural environment which includes lakes, waterways and canals, as well as a history, heritage and culture which dates from early Christian times.

== Midland Regional Authority ==
The Midland Region was administered by the Midland Regional Authority, which consisted of 24 elected representatives including the region's representative on the EU Committee of the Regions. These representatives met once a month and were nominated from the four local government councils of the region:

- Laois County Council
- Longford County Council
- Offaly County Council
- Westmeath County Council

The Regional Authorities were dissolved in 2014 and were replaced by Regional Assemblies.

== Demography ==
According to the 2022 census, the region had a population of 317,999, which constitutes 6.17% of the national population. Its population density was 47.8 persons per km^{2}.

The region has a growing dependency ratio which is stated as having implications on health care, the types of housing needed as well as care for the elderly.

== Economy ==
The most significant industry in the Midland Region is the peat industry, as well as wood processing. Its wood processing industry now accounts for over one-third of the total processed timber produced in Ireland. Other strong industries include medicine, healthcare, engineering and chemical. It also has some very successful food and drink producers.

According to Eurostat figures for 2012, the region has GDP of €5.765 bn and a GDP per capita of €20,100 the lowest in the Republic.

The workforce of the region in 2015 was 114,000, which equated to an 87.6% employment rate.

In 2017 the largest employment sectors in the Midland Region were:

1. Wholesale & retail trade 16%
2. Manufacturing industries 12%
3. Health & social work 11%
4. Education 9%
5. Public administration & defence 8%
6. Agriculture 8%

== Major settlements ==
A list of the ten largest settlements in the Midland Region. County capitals are included and are shown in bold.

Towns
Rank	Town	County	Population (2022 census)
1	**Portlaoise**	Laois	23,494
2	Athlone	Westmeath	22,869
3	**Mullingar**	Westmeath	22,667
4	**Tullamore**	Offaly	15,598
5	**Longford**	Longford	10,952
6	Portarlington	Laois/Offaly	9,288
7	Edenderry	Offaly	7,888
8	Mountmellick	Laois	4,905
9	Birr	Offaly	4,726
10	Clara	Offaly	3,403
