= ISO 3166-2:GB =

Entry for the United Kingdom in ISO 3166-2

ISO 3166-2:GB is the entry for the United Kingdom of Great Britain and Northern Ireland (GBNI) in ISO 3166-2, part of the ISO 3166 standard published by the International Organization for Standardization (ISO), which defines codes for the names of the principal divisions and subdivisions (e.g., provinces or states) of all countries coded in ISO 3166-1. The codes and structures for the United Kingdom (UK) are provided to the ISO in Geneva by the British Standards (BS) and the Office for National Statistics (ONS).

== Primary divisions ==
Currently for the United Kingdom of Great Britain and Northern Ireland, ISO 3166-2 codes are defined for the following primary divisions and subdivisions:

- Three countries and one province, as follows:

England

- 25 two-tier counties, 36 metropolitan districts, 58 unitary authorities, 32 London boroughs, and one city corporation

As of August 2025, the standard has codes for the divisions in place until 31 March 2023. On 1 April 2023, the non-metropolitan county of Cumbria was abolished and replaced by two unitary authorities (Cumberland and Westmorland and Furness), as well as the non-metropolitan counties of North Yorkshire and Somerset became unitary authorities, which as of August 2025 are not reflected in ISO 3166-2.

Northern Ireland

- 11 districts

Scotland

- 32 council areas

Wales

- 22 unitary authorities

Each ISO 3166-2:GB code consists of two parts; both parts are in upper-case capital letters, and are separated by a hyphen (without spaces). The first part for the is GB, the ISO 3166-1 alpha-2 code of the United Kingdom of Great Britain and Northern Ireland. The second part is three letters, which is the British Standard BS 6879 three-letter code of the individual subdivision.

Though GB is the United Kingdom's ISO 3166-1 alpha-2 code, UK is exceptionally reserved for the United Kingdom on the request of the country (United Kingdom). Its main usage is the .uk internet country code top-level domain (ccTLD) and, on 28 September 2021, UK replaced GB as the official country code on motor vehicle registration plates.

== Current codes ==
Subdivision names are listed as in the ISO 3166-2 standard, as published by the ISO 3166 Maintenance Agency (ISO 3166/MA).

BS 6879 gives alternative name forms in Welsh (cy) for some of the Welsh unitary authorities (together with alternative code elements). Since this part of ISO 3166 does not allow for duplicate coding of identical subdivisions, such alternative names in Welsh and code elements are shown for information purposes only in square brackets after the English name of the subdivision.

=== Countries and province ===
code	subdivision name (en-gb)	subdivision type
GB-ENG	England	country
GB-NIR	Northern Ireland	province
GB-SCT	Scotland	country
GB-WLS	Wales [Cymru GB-CYM]	country

Wales was changed from being described as a 'principality' to being described as a 'country' in the December 2011 update to the standard. England and Scotland were maintained as 'country', and Northern Ireland was maintained as 'province'.

=== Included for completeness ===
code	name
GB-EAW	England and Wales
GB-GBN	Great Britain
GB-UKM	United Kingdom

The codes GB-EAW, GB-GBN, and GB-UKM are only mentioned in remark part 2 in the ISO website, where they are 'included for completeness'.

=== Second-level subdivisions ===
code	subdivision name (en-gb)	subdivision category	parent division
GB-CAM	Cambridgeshire	two-tier county	ENG
GB-CMA	Cumbria	two-tier county	ENG
GB-DBY	Derbyshire	two-tier county	ENG
GB-DEV	Devon	two-tier county	ENG
GB-DOR	Dorset	two-tier county	ENG
GB-ESX	East Sussex	two-tier county	ENG
GB-ESS	Essex	two-tier county	ENG
GB-GLS	Gloucestershire	two-tier county	ENG
GB-HAM	Hampshire	two-tier county	ENG
GB-HRT	Hertfordshire	two-tier county	ENG
GB-KEN	Kent	two-tier county	ENG
GB-LAN	Lancashire	two-tier county	ENG
GB-LEC	Leicestershire	two-tier county	ENG
GB-LIN	Lincolnshire	two-tier county	ENG
GB-NFK	Norfolk	two-tier county	ENG
GB-NYK	North Yorkshire	two-tier county	ENG
GB-NTT	Nottinghamshire	two-tier county	ENG
GB-OXF	Oxfordshire	two-tier county	ENG
GB-SOM	Somerset	two-tier county	ENG
GB-STS	Staffordshire	two-tier county	ENG
GB-SFK	Suffolk	two-tier county	ENG
GB-SRY	Surrey	two-tier county	ENG
GB-WAR	Warwickshire	two-tier county	ENG
GB-WSX	West Sussex	two-tier county	ENG
GB-WOR	Worcestershire	two-tier county	ENG
GB-LND	London, City of	city corporation	ENG
GB-BDG	Barking and Dagenham	London borough	ENG
GB-BNE	Barnet	London borough	ENG
GB-BEX	Bexley	London borough	ENG
GB-BEN	Brent	London borough	ENG
GB-BRY	Bromley	London borough	ENG
GB-CMD	Camden	London borough	ENG
GB-CRY	Croydon	London borough	ENG
GB-EAL	Ealing	London borough	ENG
GB-ENF	Enfield	London borough	ENG
GB-GRE	Greenwich	London borough	ENG
GB-HCK	Hackney	London borough	ENG
GB-HMF	Hammersmith and Fulham	London borough	ENG
GB-HRY	Haringey	London borough	ENG
GB-HRW	Harrow	London borough	ENG
GB-HAV	Havering	London borough	ENG
GB-HIL	Hillingdon	London borough	ENG
GB-HNS	Hounslow	London borough	ENG
GB-ISL	Islington	London borough	ENG
GB-KEC	Kensington and Chelsea	London borough	ENG
GB-KTT	Kingston upon Thames	London borough	ENG
GB-LBH	Lambeth	London borough	ENG
GB-LEW	Lewisham	London borough	ENG
GB-MRT	Merton	London borough	ENG
GB-NWM	Newham	London borough	ENG
GB-RDB	Redbridge	London borough	ENG
GB-RIC	Richmond upon Thames	London borough	ENG
GB-SWK	Southwark	London borough	ENG
GB-STN	Sutton	London borough	ENG
GB-TWH	Tower Hamlets	London borough	ENG
GB-WFT	Waltham Forest	London borough	ENG
GB-WND	Wandsworth	London borough	ENG
GB-WSM	Westminster	London borough	ENG
GB-BNS	Barnsley	metropolitan district	ENG
GB-BIR	Birmingham	metropolitan district	ENG
GB-BOL	Bolton	metropolitan district	ENG
GB-BRD	Bradford	metropolitan district	ENG
GB-BUR	Bury	metropolitan district	ENG
GB-CLD	Calderdale	metropolitan district	ENG
GB-COV	Coventry	metropolitan district	ENG
GB-DNC	Doncaster	metropolitan district	ENG
GB-DUD	Dudley	metropolitan district	ENG
GB-GAT	Gateshead	metropolitan district	ENG
GB-KIR	Kirklees	metropolitan district	ENG
GB-KWL	Knowsley	metropolitan district	ENG
GB-LDS	Leeds	metropolitan district	ENG
GB-LIV	Liverpool	metropolitan district	ENG
GB-MAN	Manchester	metropolitan district	ENG
GB-NET	Newcastle upon Tyne	metropolitan district	ENG
GB-NTY	North Tyneside	metropolitan district	ENG
GB-OLD	Oldham	metropolitan district	ENG
GB-RCH	Rochdale	metropolitan district	ENG
GB-ROT	Rotherham	metropolitan district	ENG
GB-SHN	St. Helens	metropolitan district	ENG
GB-SLF	Salford	metropolitan district	ENG
GB-SAW	Sandwell	metropolitan district	ENG
GB-SFT	Sefton	metropolitan district	ENG
GB-SHF	Sheffield	metropolitan district	ENG
GB-SOL	Solihull	metropolitan district	ENG
GB-STY	South Tyneside	metropolitan district	ENG
GB-SKP	Stockport	metropolitan district	ENG
GB-SND	Sunderland	metropolitan district	ENG
GB-TAM	Tameside	metropolitan district	ENG
GB-TRF	Trafford	metropolitan district	ENG
GB-WKF	Wakefield	metropolitan district	ENG
GB-WLL	Walsall	metropolitan district	ENG
GB-WGN	Wigan	metropolitan district	ENG
GB-WRL	Wirral	metropolitan district	ENG
GB-WLV	Wolverhampton	metropolitan district	ENG
GB-BAS	Bath and North East Somerset	unitary authority	ENG
GB-BDF	Bedford	unitary authority	ENG
GB-BBD	Blackburn with Darwen	unitary authority	ENG
GB-BPL	Blackpool	unitary authority	ENG
GB-BCP	Bournemouth, Christchurch and Poole	unitary authority	ENG
GB-BRC	Bracknell Forest	unitary authority	ENG
GB-BNH	Brighton and Hove	unitary authority	ENG
GB-BST	Bristol, City of	unitary authority	ENG
GB-BKM	Buckinghamshire	unitary authority	ENG
GB-CBF	Central Bedfordshire	unitary authority	ENG
GB-CHE	Cheshire East	unitary authority	ENG
GB-CHW	Cheshire West and Chester	unitary authority	ENG
GB-CON	Cornwall	unitary authority	ENG
GB-DAL	Darlington	unitary authority	ENG
GB-DER	Derby	unitary authority	ENG
GB-DUR	Durham, County	unitary authority	ENG
GB-ERY	East Riding of Yorkshire	unitary authority	ENG
GB-HAL	Halton	unitary authority	ENG
GB-HPL	Hartlepool	unitary authority	ENG
GB-HEF	Herefordshire	unitary authority	ENG
GB-IOW	Isle of Wight	unitary authority	ENG
GB-IOS	Isles of Scilly	unitary authority	ENG
GB-KHL	Kingston upon Hull	unitary authority	ENG
GB-LCE	Leicester	unitary authority	ENG
GB-LUT	Luton	unitary authority	ENG
GB-MDW	Medway	unitary authority	ENG
GB-MDB	Middlesbrough	unitary authority	ENG
GB-MIK	Milton Keynes	unitary authority	ENG
GB-NEL	North East Lincolnshire	unitary authority	ENG
GB-NLN	North Lincolnshire	unitary authority	ENG
GB-NNH	North Northamptonshire	unitary authority	ENG
GB-NSM	North Somerset	unitary authority	ENG
GB-NBL	Northumberland	unitary authority	ENG
GB-NGM	Nottingham	unitary authority	ENG
GB-PTE	Peterborough	unitary authority	ENG
GB-PLY	Plymouth	unitary authority	ENG
GB-POR	Portsmouth	unitary authority	ENG
GB-RDG	Reading	unitary authority	ENG
GB-RCC	Redcar and Cleveland	unitary authority	ENG
GB-RUT	Rutland	unitary authority	ENG
GB-SHR	Shropshire	unitary authority	ENG
GB-SLG	Slough	unitary authority	ENG
GB-SGC	South Gloucestershire	unitary authority	ENG
GB-STH	Southampton	unitary authority	ENG
GB-SOS	Southend-on-Sea	unitary authority	ENG
GB-STT	Stockton-on-Tees	unitary authority	ENG
GB-STE	Stoke-on-Trent	unitary authority	ENG
GB-SWD	Swindon	unitary authority	ENG
GB-TFW	Telford and Wrekin	unitary authority	ENG
GB-THR	Thurrock	unitary authority	ENG
GB-TOB	Torbay	unitary authority	ENG
GB-WRT	Warrington	unitary authority	ENG
GB-WBK	West Berkshire	unitary authority	ENG
GB-WNH	West Northamptonshire	unitary authority	ENG
GB-WIL	Wiltshire	unitary authority	ENG
GB-WNM	Windsor and Maidenhead	unitary authority	ENG
GB-WOK	Wokingham	unitary authority	ENG
GB-YOR	York	unitary authority	ENG
GB-ANN	Antrim and Newtownabbey	district	NIR
GB-AND	Ards and North Down	district	NIR
GB-ABC	Armagh City, Banbridge and Craigavon	district	NIR
GB-BFS	Belfast City	district	NIR
GB-CCG	Causeway Coast and Glens	district	NIR
GB-DRS	Derry and Strabane	district	NIR
GB-FMO	Fermanagh and Omagh	district	NIR
GB-LBC	Lisburn and Castlereagh	district	NIR
GB-MEA	Mid and East Antrim	district	NIR
GB-MUL	Mid-Ulster	district	NIR
GB-NMD	Newry, Mourne and Down	district	NIR
GB-ABE	Aberdeen City	council area	SCT
GB-ABD	Aberdeenshire	council area	SCT
GB-ANS	Angus	council area	SCT
GB-AGB	Argyll and Bute	council area	SCT
GB-CLK	Clackmannanshire	council area	SCT
GB-DGY	Dumfries and Galloway	council area	SCT
GB-DND	Dundee City	council area	SCT
GB-EAY	East Ayrshire	council area	SCT
GB-EDU	East Dunbartonshire	council area	SCT
GB-ELN	East Lothian	council area	SCT
GB-ERW	East Renfrewshire	council area	SCT
GB-EDH	Edinburgh, City of	council area	SCT
GB-ELS	Eilean Siar	council area	SCT
GB-FAL	Falkirk	council area	SCT
GB-FIF	Fife	council area	SCT
GB-GLG	Glasgow City	council area	SCT
GB-HLD	Highland	council area	SCT
GB-IVC	Inverclyde	council area	SCT
GB-MLN	Midlothian	council area	SCT
GB-MRY	Moray	council area	SCT
GB-NAY	North Ayrshire	council area	SCT
GB-NLK	North Lanarkshire	council area	SCT
GB-ORK	Orkney Islands	council area	SCT
GB-PKN	Perth and Kinross	council area	SCT
GB-RFW	Renfrewshire	council area	SCT
GB-SCB	Scottish Borders	council area	SCT
GB-ZET	Shetland Islands	council area	SCT
GB-SAY	South Ayrshire	council area	SCT
GB-SLK	South Lanarkshire	council area	SCT
GB-STG	Stirling	council area	SCT
GB-WDU	West Dunbartonshire	council area	SCT
GB-WLN	West Lothian	council area	SCT
GB-BGW	Blaenau Gwent	unitary authority	WLS
GB-BGE	Bridgend [Pen-y-bont ar Ogwr GB-POG]	unitary authority	WLS
GB-CAY	Caerphilly [Caerffili GB-CAF]	unitary authority	WLS
GB-CRF	Cardiff [Caerdydd GB-CRD]	unitary authority	WLS
GB-CMN	Carmarthenshire [Sir Gaerfyrddin GB-GFY]	unitary authority	WLS
GB-CGN	Ceredigion [Sir Ceredigion]	unitary authority	WLS
GB-CWY	Conwy	unitary authority	WLS
GB-DEN	Denbighshire [Sir Ddinbych GB-DDB]	unitary authority	WLS
GB-FLN	Flintshire [Sir y Fflint GB-FFL]	unitary authority	WLS
GB-GWN	Gwynedd	unitary authority	WLS
GB-AGY	Isle of Anglesey [Sir Ynys Môn GB-YNM]	unitary authority	WLS
GB-MTY	Merthyr Tydfil [Merthyr Tudful GB-MTU]	unitary authority	WLS
GB-MON	Monmouthshire [Sir Fynwy GB-FYN]	unitary authority	WLS
GB-NTL	Neath Port Talbot [Castell-nedd Port Talbot GB-CTL]	unitary authority	WLS
GB-NWP	Newport [Casnewydd GB-CNW]	unitary authority	WLS
GB-PEM	Pembrokeshire [Sir Benfro GB-BNF]	unitary authority	WLS
GB-POW	Powys	unitary authority	WLS
GB-RCT	Rhondda Cynon Taff [Rhondda CynonTaf]	unitary authority	WLS
GB-SWA	Swansea [Abertawe GB-ATA]	unitary authority	WLS
GB-TOF	Torfaen [Tor-faen]	unitary authority	WLS
GB-VGL	Vale of Glamorgan, The [Bro Morgannwg GB-BMG]	unitary authority	WLS
GB-WRX	Wrexham [Wrecsam GB-WRC]	unitary authority	WLS

The British Overseas Territories of Anguilla, Bermuda, the British Indian Ocean Territory, the British Virgin Islands, the Cayman Islands, the Falkland Islands, Gibraltar, Montserrat, the Pitcairn Islands, Saint Helena, Ascension and Tristan da Cunha, South Georgia and the South Sandwich Islands and the Turks and Caicos Islands (and the Crown Dependencies of Guernsey, the Isle of Man and Jersey as of 2006) have their own ISO 3166-1 codes and are not included in the United Kingdom's entry in ISO 3166-2. There are no ISO 3166-2 codes for:

- Akrotiri and Dhekelia
- British Antarctic Territory (part of Antarctica with country code AQ)

== Changes ==
The following changes to the entry have been announced in newsletters by the ISO 3166/MA since the first publication of ISO 3166-2 in 1998. ISO stopped issuing newsletters in 2013.

Newsletter	Date issued	Description of change in newsletter	Code / subdivision change
Newsletter I-2	2002-05-21	Various corrections of name forms, i.e., deletion of name adjuncts	
Newsletter I-8	2007-04-17	Modification of the administrative structure	Subdivisions deleted: GB-CHA – Channel Islands; GB-IOM – Isle of Man (see ISO 3166-2:IM); GB-GSY – Guernsey (see ISO 3166-2:GG); GB-JSY – Jersey (see ISO 3166-2:JE)
Newsletter I-9	2007-11-28	Modification of administrative structure	
Newsletter II-2	2010-06-30	Update and reorganisation of the subdivision data, update of the list source	Subdivisions added: GB-BDF – Bedford; GB-CBF – Central Bedfordshire; GB-CHE – Cheshire East; GB-CHW – Cheshire West and Chester; Subdivisions deleted: GB-BDF – Bedfordshire; GB-CHS – Cheshire; GB-IOS – Isles of Scilly
Newsletter II-3	2011-12-13 (corrected 2011-12-15)	NL II-2 correction for administrative name changes	Status change: WLS – Wales principality → country

The following changes to the entry are listed on ISO's online catalogue, the Online Browsing Platform:

Effective date of change	Short description of change (en-gb)
2022-11-29	Deletion of two-tier county GB-NTH; addition of unitary authorities GB-NNH, GB-WNH; change of category name from two-tier county to unitary authority for GB-BKM; update list source.
2022-03-03	Correction of parent subdivision of GB-PEM
2021-11-25	Addition of subdivision categories country and province in eng & fra; modification of remark part 2; addition of country GB-ENG, GB-WLS, GB-SCT; addition of province GB-NIR; addition of parent subdivisions
2020-11-24	Deletion of GB-BMH, GB-POL; addition of GB-BCP; correction of spelling for GB-BFS, GB-DRS, GB-DUR, GB-MUL, GB-RCT, GB-SCB; modification of remark, part 2; update list source
2019-11-22	Change of subdivision name of GB-ABC, GB-DRS; modification of remark part 2; update list source
2015-11-27	Deletion of Northern Ireland district council areas GB-ANT, GB-ARD, GB-ARM, GB-BLA, GB-BLY, GB-BNB, GB-CKF, GB-CSR, GB-CLR, GB-CKT, GB-CGV, GB-DRY, GB-DOW, GB-DGN, GB-FER, GB-LRN, GB-LMV, GB-LSB, GB-MFT, GB-MYL, GB-NYM, GB-NTA, GB-NDN, GB-OMH, GB-STB; change of subdivision category from district council area to district GB-BFS; addition of Northern Ireland districts GB-ANN, GB-AND, GB-ABC, GB-CCG, GB-DRS, GB-FMO, GB-LBC, GB-MEA, GB-MUL, GB-NMD; update list source
2014-12-18	Alignment of the English and French short names upper and lower case with UNTERM; update of the remarks in French
2014-10-30	Re-add GB-IOS
2011-12-13	NL II-2 correction for administrative name changes
2010-06-30	Update and reorganization of the subdivision data and update of the list source

== See also ==
- Subdivisions of the United Kingdom
  - Subdivisions of England
  - Subdivisions of Northern Ireland
  - Subdivisions of Scotland
  - Subdivisions of Wales
- FIPS region codes of the United Kingdom
- NUTS codes of the United Kingdom
- Chapman codes
- Neighbouring countries: CY (via Akrotiri and Dhekelia), IE
