= Northern and Western Region =

NUTS 2 region in Ireland

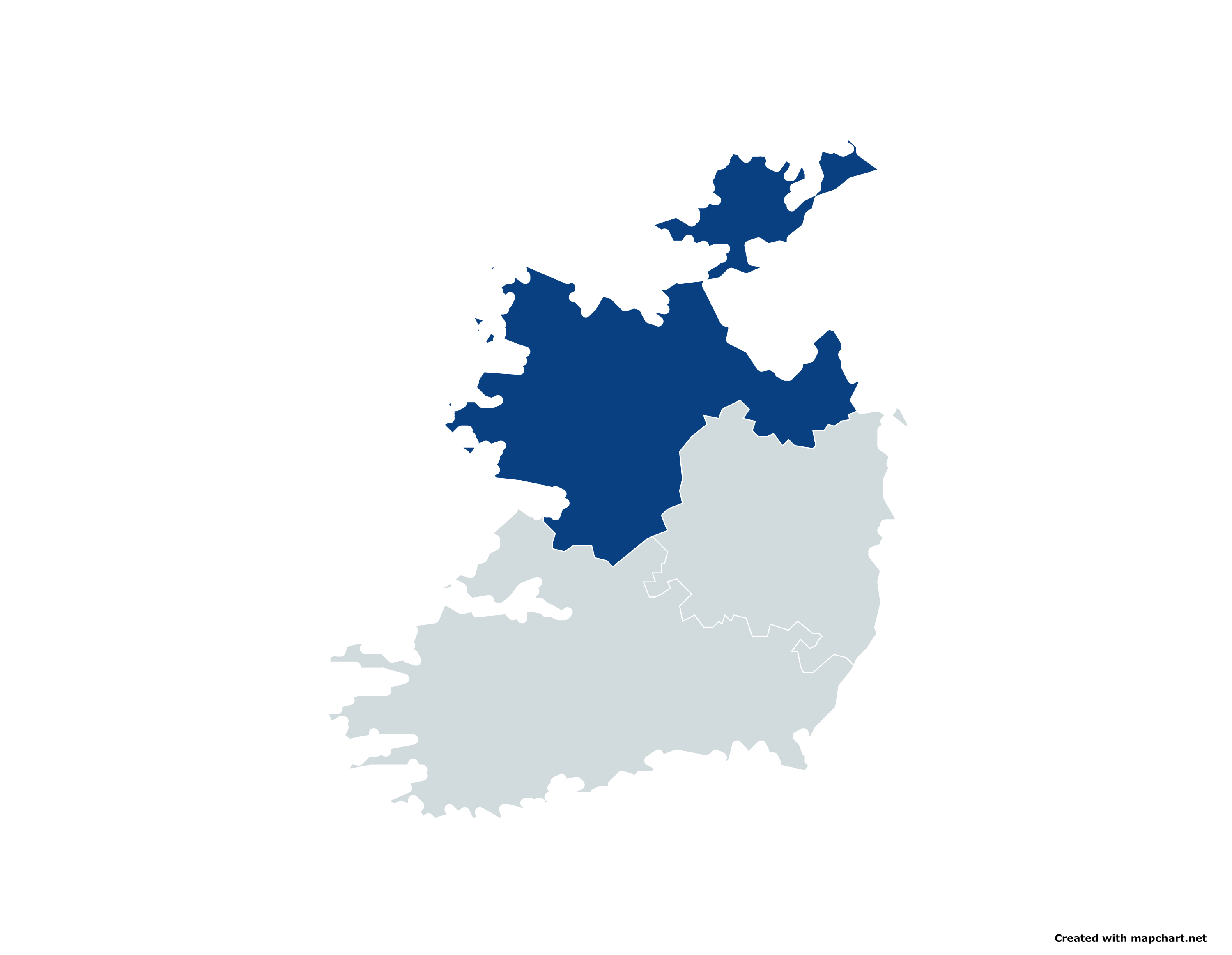
- Northern and Western Region in blue
- Coordinates: 54.245°N 8.237°W
- Country: Ireland

Area
  - Total: 25,317 km^{2} (9,775 sq mi)

Population (2022)
  - Total: 900,937
  - Density: 35.586/km^{2} (92.168/sq mi)

GDP
  - Total: €44.933 billion (2024)
  - Per capita: €46,903 (2024)
- Website: Official website
- Map of Northern and Western Region

The Northern and Western Region has been a region within Ireland since 1 January 2015. It is a NUTS Level II statistical region of Ireland (coded IE04).

NUTS 2 Regions may be classified as less developed regions, transition regions, or more developed regions to determine eligibility for funding under the European Regional Development Fund and the European Social Fund Plus. In 2021, the Northern and Western Region was classified as a transition region.

The Northern and Western Regional Assembly is composed of members nominated from the local authorities in the region. It is one of three Regional Assemblies in Ireland established in 2015 following an amendment to the Local Government Act 1991, replacing 8 Regional Authorities with 3 Regional Assemblies. Its members are nominated from among the members of its constituent local authorities.

The Region contains two strategic planning areas, each of which is a NUTS Level III statistical region, and mostly correspond with the former Regional Authority Regions.

SPA	NUTS 3 Code	Local government areas	NWRA members	Population (2022)
Border	IE041	County Cavan	2	81,201
Border	IE041	County Donegal	3	166,321
Border	IE041	County Leitrim	2	35,087
Border	IE041	County Monaghan	2	64,832
Border	IE041	County Sligo	2	69,819
West	IE042	Galway City	2	83,456
West	IE042	County Galway	3	192,995
West	IE042	County Mayo	2	137,231
West	IE042	County Roscommon	2	69,995
