= ISO 3166-2:IE =

Entry for the Republic of Ireland in ISO 3166-2

ISO 3166-2:IE is the entry for Ireland in ISO 3166-2, part of the ISO 3166 standard published by the International Organization for Standardization (ISO), which defines codes for the names of the principal subdivisions (e.g., provinces or states) of all countries coded in ISO 3166-1.

Currently for Ireland, ISO 3166-2 codes are defined for two levels of subdivisions:

- Four provinces
- 26 counties

The 26 counties are traditional counties, which are different from the first-level administrative subdivisions of Ireland.

Each code consists of two parts, separated by a hyphen. The first part is IE, the ISO 3166-1 alpha-2 code of Ireland. The second part is one or two letters. For the counties, the letters are generally the same as those currently used in vehicle registration plates, with the following exceptions:

- County Cork vehicles rather than CO use C; in ISO 3166-2 the latter is used for the province of Connacht.
- Three counties where there were multiple councils and vehicle codes until the Local Government Reform Act 2014:
  - County Limerick vehicles rather than LK now use L, which had been restricted to the city of Limerick before 2014
  - County Waterford vehicles rather than WD now use W, which had been restricted to the city of Waterford before 2014
  - County Tipperary vehicles rather than TA use T . Before 2014 North Tipperary and South Tipperary used TN and TS respectively.

== Current codes ==
Subdivision names are listed as in the ISO 3166-2 standard published by the ISO 3166 Maintenance Agency (ISO 3166/MA).

ISO 639-1 codes are used to represent subdivision names in the following administrative languages:

- (en): English
- (ga): Irish

Click on the button in the header to sort each column.

=== Provinces ===
| Code | Subdivision name (en) | Subdivision name (ga) |
|---|---|---|
| IE-C | Connaught | Connacht |
| IE-L | Leinster | Laighin |
| IE-M | Munster | An Mhumhain |
| IE-U | Ulster (Note: Only three of the nine historic counties of Ulster are in the Republic of Ireland; the other six form Northern Ireland, a part of the United Kingdom, and are listed under GB-NIR.) | Ulaidh |

=== Counties ===
| Code | Subdivision name (en) | Subdivision name (ga) | In province |
|---|---|---|---|
| IE-CW | Carlow | Ceatharlach | L |
| IE-CN | Cavan | An Cabhán | U |
| IE-CE | Clare | An Clár | M |
| IE-CO | Cork | Corcaigh | M |
| IE-DL | Donegal | Dún na nGall | U |
| IE-D | Dublin | Baile Átha Cliath | L |
| IE-G | Galway | Gaillimh | C |
| IE-KY | Kerry | Ciarraí | M |
| IE-KE | Kildare | Cill Dara | L |
| IE-KK | Kilkenny | Cill Chainnigh | L |
| IE-LS | Laois | Laois | L |
| IE-LM | Leitrim | Liatroim | C |
| IE-LK | Limerick | Luimneach | M |
| IE-LD | Longford | An Longfort | L |
| IE-LH | Louth | Lú | L |
| IE-MO | Mayo | Maigh Eo | C |
| IE-MH | Meath | An Mhí | L |
| IE-MN | Monaghan | Muineachán | U |
| IE-OY | Offaly | Uíbh Fhailí | L |
| IE-RN | Roscommon | Ros Comáin | C |
| IE-SO | Sligo | Sligeach | C |
| IE-TA | Tipperary | Tiobraid Árann | M |
| IE-WD | Waterford | Port Láirge | M |
| IE-WH | Westmeath | An Iarmhí | L |
| IE-WX | Wexford | Loch Garman | L |
| IE-WW | Wicklow | Cill Mhantáin | L |

== Changes ==
The following changes to the entry have been announced in newsletters by the ISO 3166/MA since the first publication of ISO 3166-2 in 1998:

| Newsletter | Date issued | Description of change in newsletter | Code/Subdivision change |
|---|---|---|---|
| Newsletter II-1 | 2010-02-03 (corrected 2010-02-19) | Addition of the country code prefix as the first code element | |
| Newsletter II-3 | 2011-12-13 (corrected 2011-12-15) | Removal of duplicate code | Codes: Cork IE-C → IE-CO |

== See also ==
- FIPS region codes of Ireland
- Neighbouring country: GB
- NUTS codes of Ireland
- Subdivisions of Ireland
