= Border Region =

NUTS 3 statistical region of the Republic of Ireland

Coordinates: 53°57′48.5″N 7°21′26.8″W

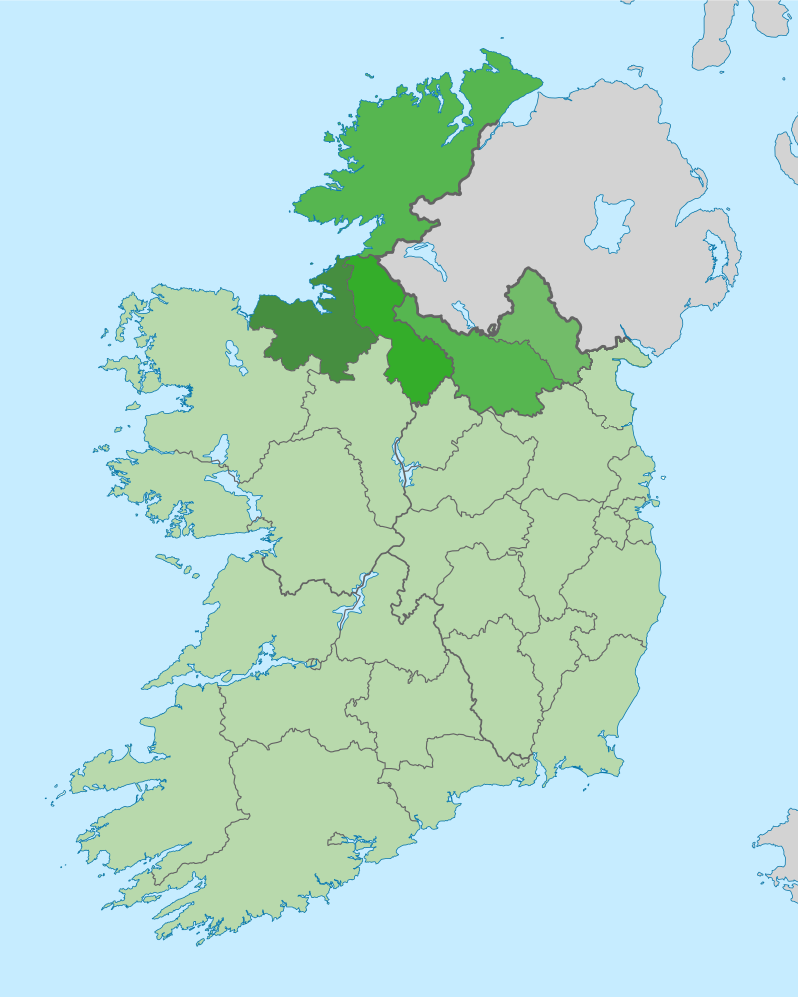
The Border Region of the Republic of Ireland, with each constituent county council highlighted. County Sligo is highlighted in dark green as it is not actually located on the Border.

The Border Region (coded IE041) is a NUTS Level III statistical region within the Republic of Ireland. The name of the region refers to its location along the Republic of Ireland–United Kingdom border. It is not a cross-border region, so does not include any part of Northern Ireland. It comprises the Irish counties of Cavan, Donegal, Leitrim, Monaghan and Sligo. The Border Region spans 11,516 km^{2}, 16.4% of the total area of the state, and has a population of 419,473 persons as of the 2022 census, 8.14% of the state total.

Prior to 2014, the region was administered by the Border Regional Authority. As of 2015, it is a strategic planning area within the Northern and Western Region.

The region's largest towns are Letterkenny and Sligo, both of which have populations of over 20,000.

== Territory ==
The local government areas in the Border Region are:

- County Donegal (Ulster)
- County Cavan (Ulster)
- County Monaghan (Ulster)
- County Sligo (Connacht)
- County Leitrim (Connacht)

=== Territorial change ===
In 2018, County Louth was transferred to the Mid-East Region, reducing the number of Border Region counties from 6 to 5. Due to its position along the Dublin–Belfast corridor and strong economic ties with the Greater Dublin Area, County Louth was removed from the Border Region despite sharing a border with County Armagh in Northern Ireland. These changes had a number of implications. County Louth represented 24.6% of the population of the Border Region and was its second most populous county after County Donegal. In addition, the region's two largest towns, Dundalk and Drogheda, were lost, as was the region's connection to the Irish Sea. County Louth was also the only Leinster county in the region. Drogheda, at just 48 km (30 mi) from Dublin, was the region's closest town to the capital. Following the change, Virginia, in the south of County Cavan, now holds that title, at 85 km (just over 52 miles) away.

== Former Regional Authority ==
Border Region, 2003-2018

From 1994 to 2014, the Border Region was administered by the Border Regional Authority, which consisted of 38 elected representatives including the region's representative on the EU Committee of the Regions. These representatives met once a month and were nominated from the six local authorities of the region:

- Donegal County Council
- Louth County Council
- Cavan County Council
- Monaghan County Council
- Sligo County Council
- Leitrim County Council

The Regional Authorities were dissolved in 2014 and were replaced by Regional Assemblies, which took their current form on 1 January 2015.

== Demographics ==
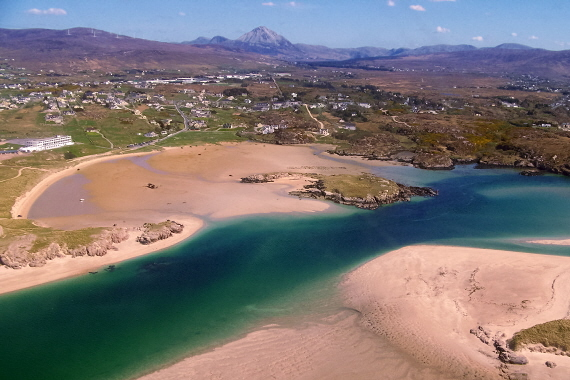
Gweedore, County Donegal, is a Gaeltacht area famed for its tradition.

Much like the rest of Ireland, the Border Region has a steadily increasing population, although it remains on average the slowest growing region in the country. The region's population growth is split along east–west lines, owing to the more easterly border counties' proximity to Dublin. Cavan is one of Ireland's fastest growing counties, having registered a 4% population increase between 2011 and 2016. In contrast, Donegal is Ireland's most rapidly declining county, having shrank 1.5% during that same period.

County	Area (km2)	Population	% of region pop.	Change 2011-2016
Donegal	4,861	158,755	40.4%	**-1.2%**
Cavan	1,932	76,092	19.4%	**4.0%**
Sligo	1,838	65,535	16.7%	**-0.1%**
Monaghan	1,295	60,483	15.4%	**1.3%**
Leitrim	1,590	31,972	8.1%	**0.5%**

According to the 2016 census, the Border Region had a population of 392,837, which constitutes 8.28% of the national population. Its population density was 34.1 persons per km, the second lowest in the country. Donegal is by far the largest county in the Border Region by both area and population.

The Border Region contains a number of nationally significant Gaeltacht areas, such as Gweedore, The Rosses and Tory Island. The dialect generally spoken in the border region is Ulster Irish, while County Donegal has its own distinct sub-dialect known as West Ulster Irish, colloquially referred to as "Donegal Irish". 25% of Ireland's Gaeltacht population lives within County Donegal. Despite this, the Border Region has the lowest percentage of Irish speakers of any region. The percentage of Irish speakers by county is: Leitrim (40%), Sligo (39.9%), Monghan (37.6%) Donegal (37.1%) and Cavan (34.6%).

The region only contains 17 towns with a population of over 2,000 people. 7 of these are located in Donegal, 5 in Cavan, 3 in Monaghan and 1 in both Sligo and Leitrim respectively.

=== Major settlements ===
A list of the ten largest settlements in the Border Region.

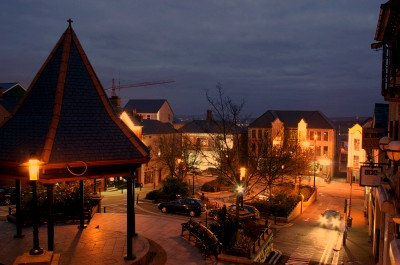
Letterkenny, County Donegal

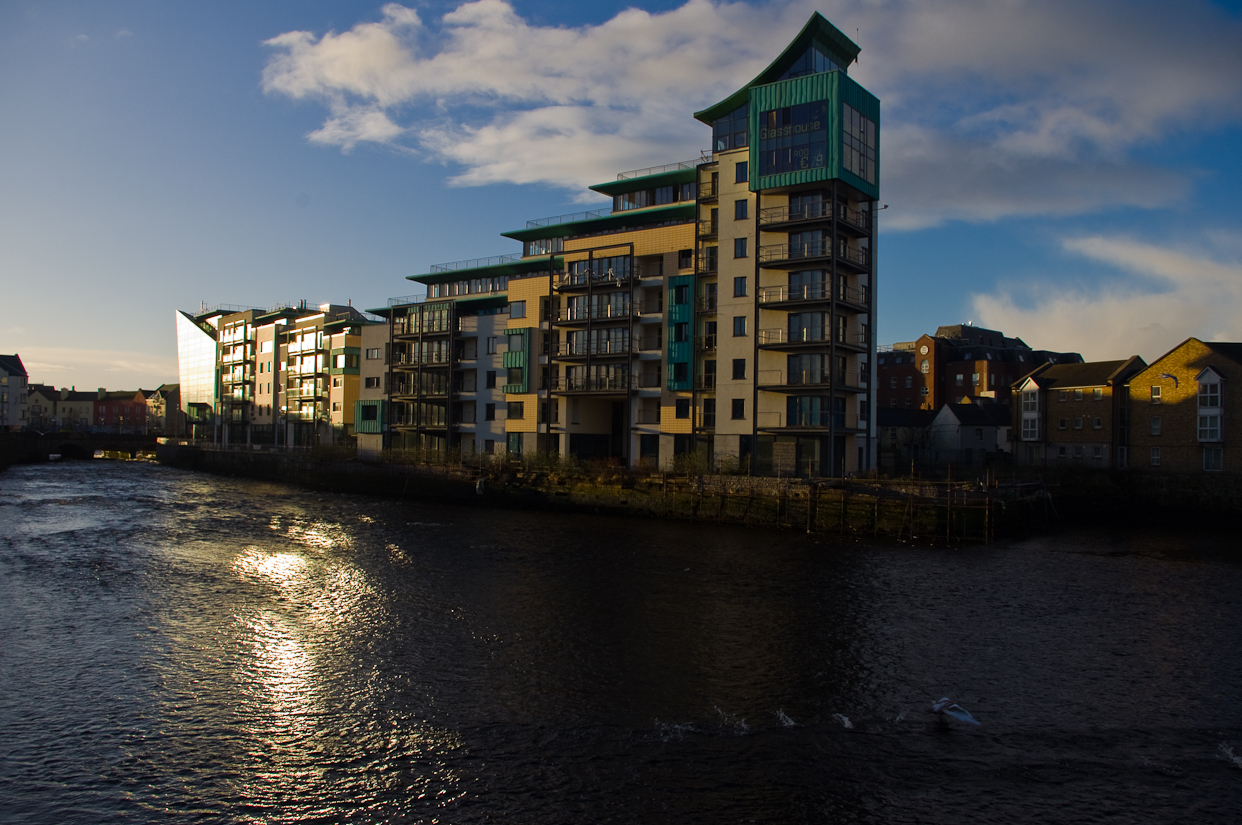
Sligo, County Sligo

County capitals are included and are shown in bold.

Towns
Rank	Town	County	Population (2022 census)
1	Letterkenny	Donegal	22,549
2	**Sligo**	Sligo	20,608
3	**Cavan**	Cavan	11,741
4	**Monaghan**	Monaghan	7,894
5	Buncrana	Donegal	6,971
6	Carrickmacross	Monaghan	5,745
7	Ballybofey-Stranorlar	Donegal	5,406
8	**Carrick-on-Shannon**	Leitrim & Roscommon	4,743
9	Castleblayney	Monaghan	3,926
10	Virginia	Cavan	3,211

== Economy ==
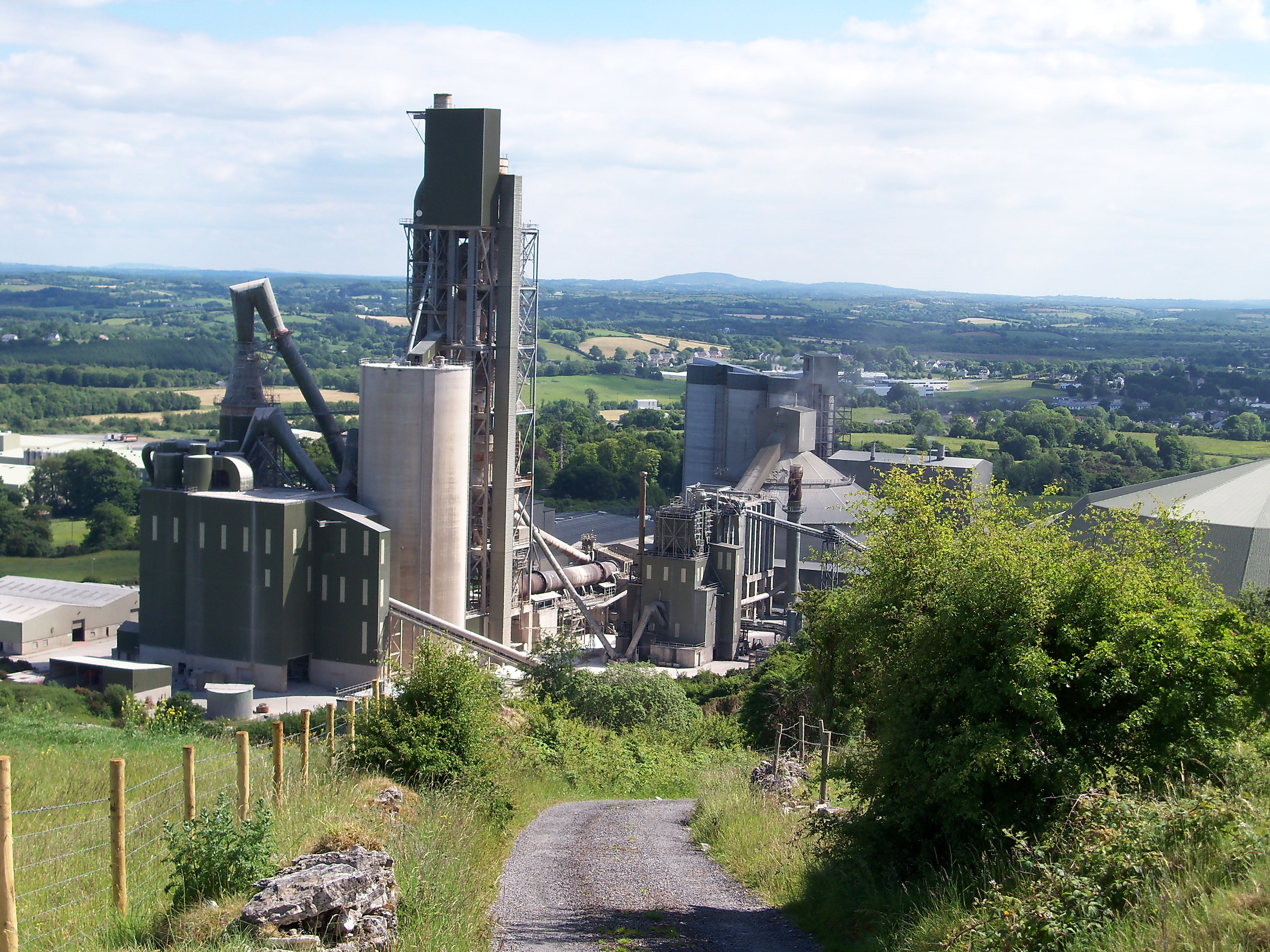
A cement factory in Ballyconnell, County Cavan.

According to Eurostat figures for 2016, the region had GDP of €11.399 bn and a GDP per capita of €21,885, the lowest per capita GDP in the country. This 2016 data included County Louth, the CSO has yet to publish 2018 data for the new boundary. The Post-2008 Irish economic downturn had a devastating impact on the Border Region. In 2007, regional GDP per capita was €30,697, by 2014 it had fallen to €19,957. While economic activity is growing steadily, it still remains well below peak levels.

Services, agriculture, manufacturing, fishing and tourism are all important industries in the region. According to 2016 CSO data on Gross value added by region, Services account for 64.1% of the regional economy, followed by Manufacturing and Construction at 32.8% and Agriculture at 3%. Tourism to the Border Region, while continuing to grow in significance, is hindered by poor infrastructure.

The region is largely rural, characterized by typically much smaller farms than seen in the Mid-East or Mid-West. Agriculture in the region produces €396.2 million per year; however, government subsidies account for 68.1% of this income. Approximately 65% of all commercial fish landings in Ireland take place in County Donegal.

A study by the European Committee of the Regions found that Ireland's border counties were the most exposed in Europe to the economic effects of Brexit. Cross-border trade between Northern Ireland and the Republic is centered around the Border Region, and some 33% of Border Region exports go to the UK, well above the state total of 18%.

In the second quarter of 2017, regional unemployment was registered at 6.6%, slightly above the national rate of 6.4%. The labour force (over 15 years of age) was estimated to be in excess of 210,000 persons.

== Geography ==
=== Physical Geography & Climate ===
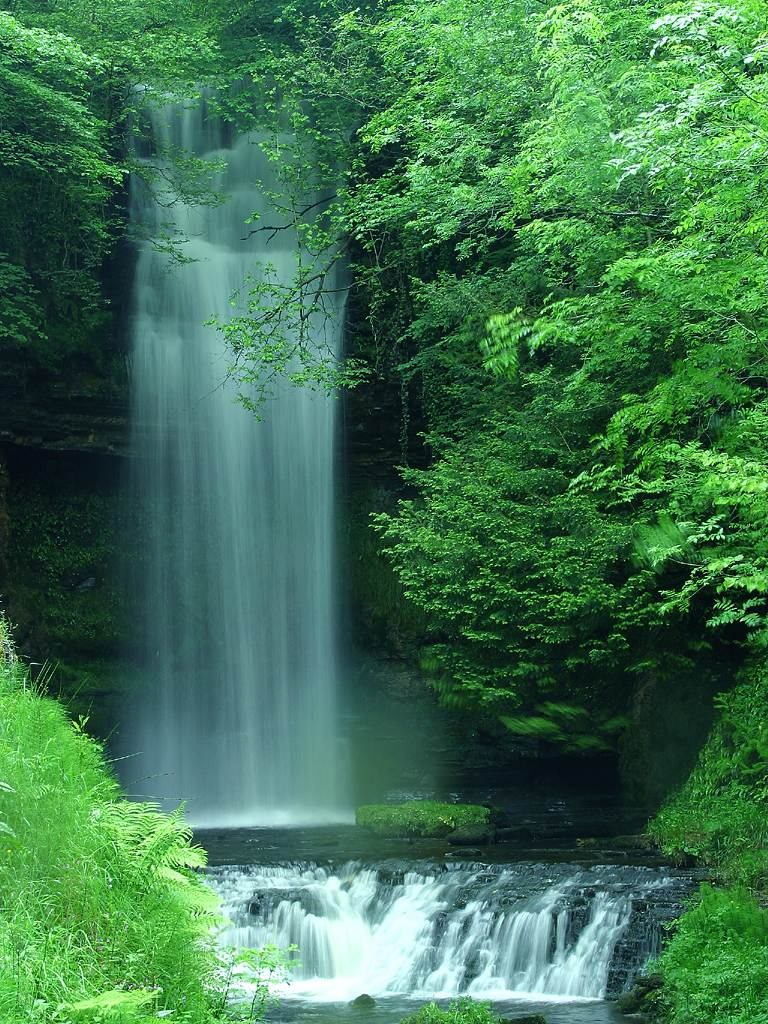
Glencar Waterfall, County Leitrim

The region encompasses the entire northwest coast of Ireland along the Atlantic Ocean. Two of Ireland's longest rivers, the Shannon and the Erne, have their source in the region. The Shannon rises from the famed Shannon Pot in County Cavan and the Erne rises from Slieve Glah, also in County Cavan. The two rivers have been connected to form one of the world's longest waterways - the Shannon–Erne Waterway. Cavan and Monaghan in the east of the region are characterized by a drumlin landscape, with hundreds of loughs interspersed between. Lough Allen in Leitrim is the region's largest lake, at 35 km2.

The west of the region, from Tullyhaw, County Cavan, to the Atlantic coast is largely rocky and mountainous, with dramatic coastal cliff landscapes as well as pure sand beaches seen in counties Sligo, Donegal and Leitrim. Leitrim has the smallest coastline of any county, at just 5 km in length, while Donegal has the longest, at 1,134 km (just over 706 miles).

According to the 2017 National Forestry Inventory, there is a total of 130,345 hectares (322,090 acres) of forest and woodland cover in the Border Region, equating to 11.3% of the region's land area. This is in keeping with the national average forest cover of 11%. The region traditionally had a very low cover forest and planting schemes were undertaken by the Department of Agriculture or state-sponsored bodies such as Coillte. Forest cover in the region has increased rapidly in recent years, primarily driven by the emergence of Privately owned forests. This is especially evident in County Leitrim, which is now Ireland's most forested county at 18.9% forest cover, having overtaken County Wicklow, and up from just 12.9% in 2006. Unlike County Donegal, where two-thirds of the county's forests are state-owned, over 50% of County Leitrim's forests are under private ownership.

Under Köppen climate classification, the region experiences a maritime temperate oceanic climate with cold winters, mild humid summers, and a lack of temperature extremes. Met Éireann has several monitoring stations across the region which record climate data. Summer daytime temperatures range between 15 and 22 °C (59 and 72 °F), with temperatures rarely going beyond 25 °C (77 °F). While the region generally experiences mild winters, upland areas, particularly in Donegal, typically receive snowfall each year. Humidity is high year round and rainfall is evenly distributed throughout the year, with annual precipitation ranging from ~1,250 mm (Markree Castle, Sligo) to ~1,000 mm (Ballyhaise, Cavan).

=== Geology ===
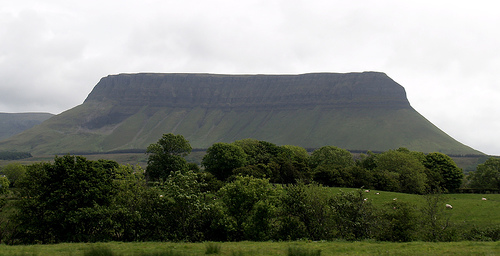
Ben Bulben, County Sligo

There are many large mountain ranges and high sea cliffs in the region, such as the Derryveagh Mountains, Slieve League, the Cuilcagh Mountains and Ben Bulben. The region is generally underlain by Ordovician and Silurian Shales and Greywackes, laid down 417-495 million years ago. These are found in eastern Cavan and Monaghan. The bedrock of western Cavan, Leitrim and Sligo is composed mostly of Carboniferous limestones that were laid roughly 355 million years ago. However, a 1.5 billion year old narrow strip of metamorphosed gneisses extend across Sligo near the Ox Mountains.

County Donegal in Ulster has one of the most complex geologies in Ireland. Much of the county is underlain by Precambrian gneiss, schist and quartzite, laid down during the Grenvillian Orogeny 700 million years ago. The Border Region's highest point, Errigal, at 751 m (2,464 ft), is composed of Precambrian quartzite. Ireland's oldest rocks, laid down 1.78 billion years ago, are found on the island of Inishtrahull. Inishtrahull is Ireland's most northerly island, located approximately 10 km north of Malin Head, mainland Ireland's most northerly point. Lough Swilly in Donegal is one of Ireland's three fjords. Owing to its scenic and rugged landscape, Donegal was named National Geographic's "Coolest place on the Planet" in 2017.

=== Gallery ===
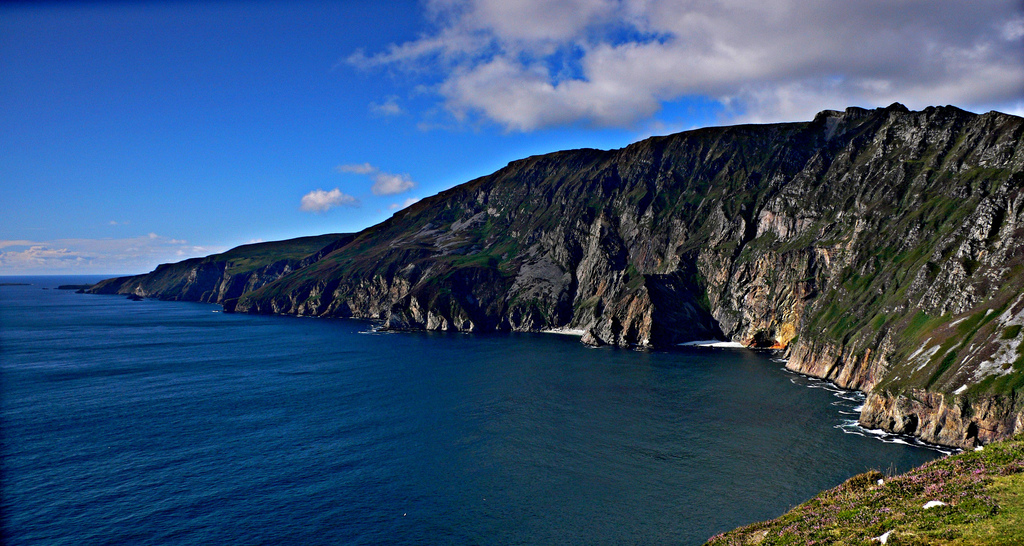
Slieve League,
County Donegal

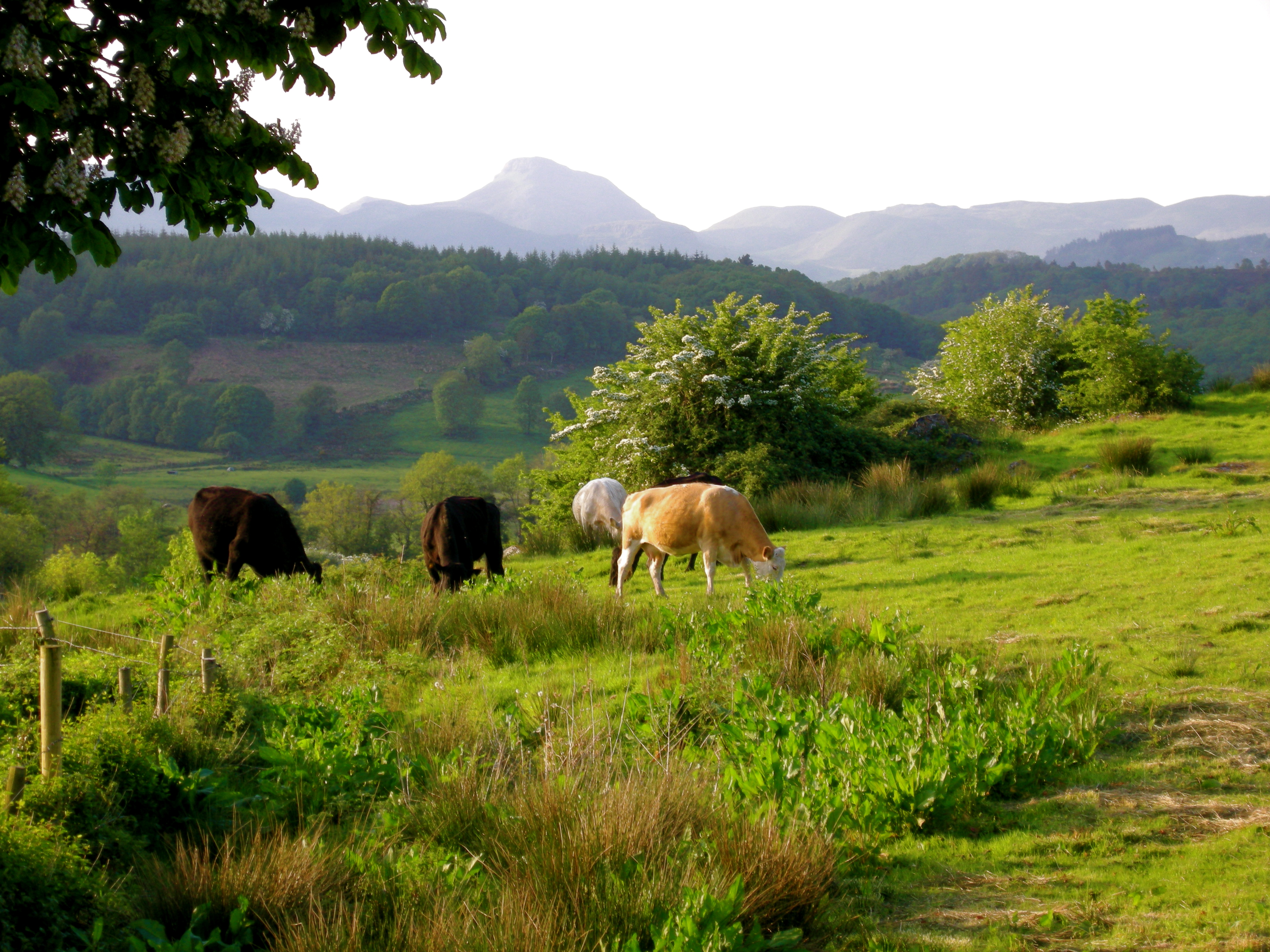
Dromahair,
County Leitrim

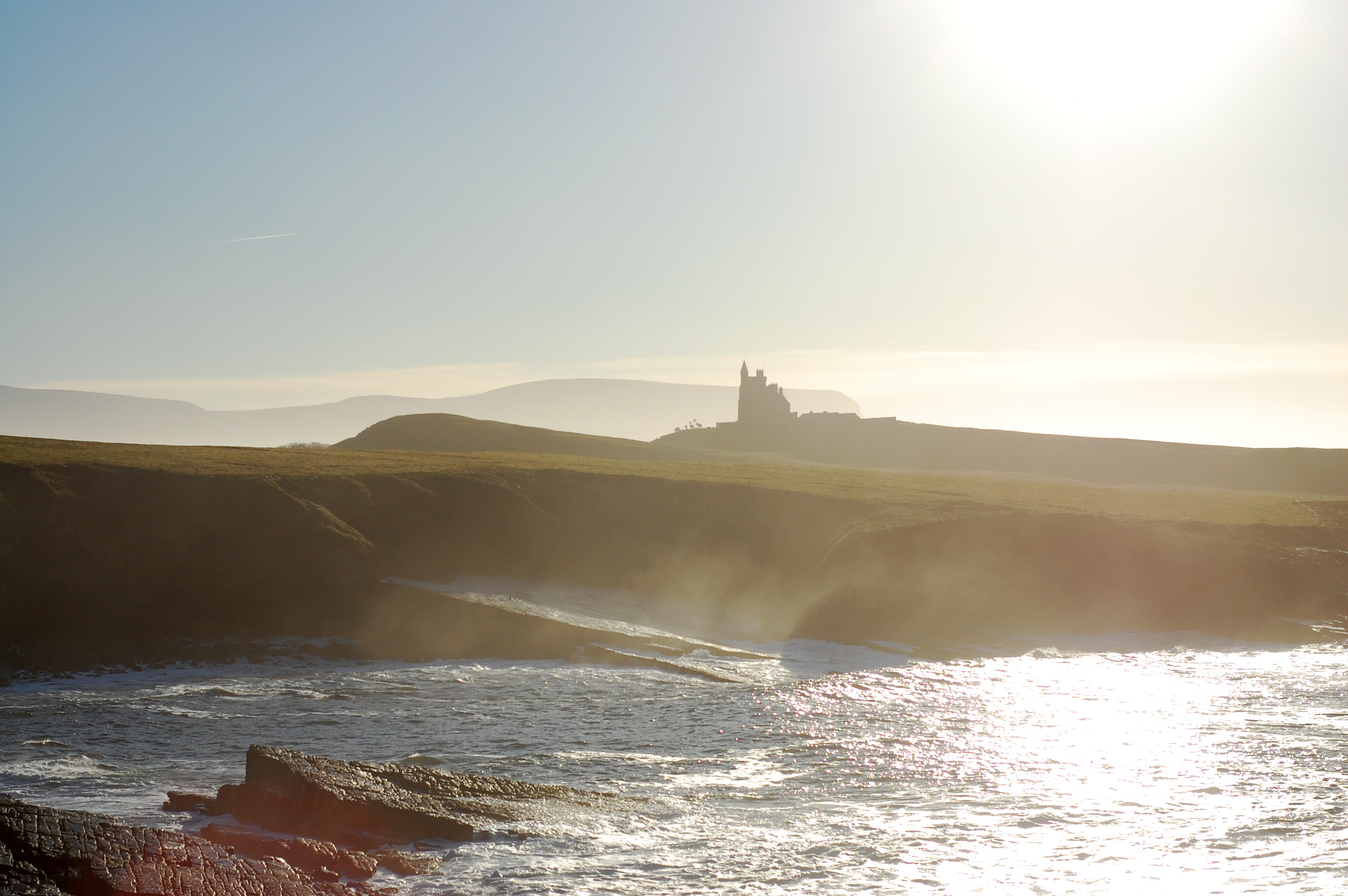
Mullaghmore,
County Sligo

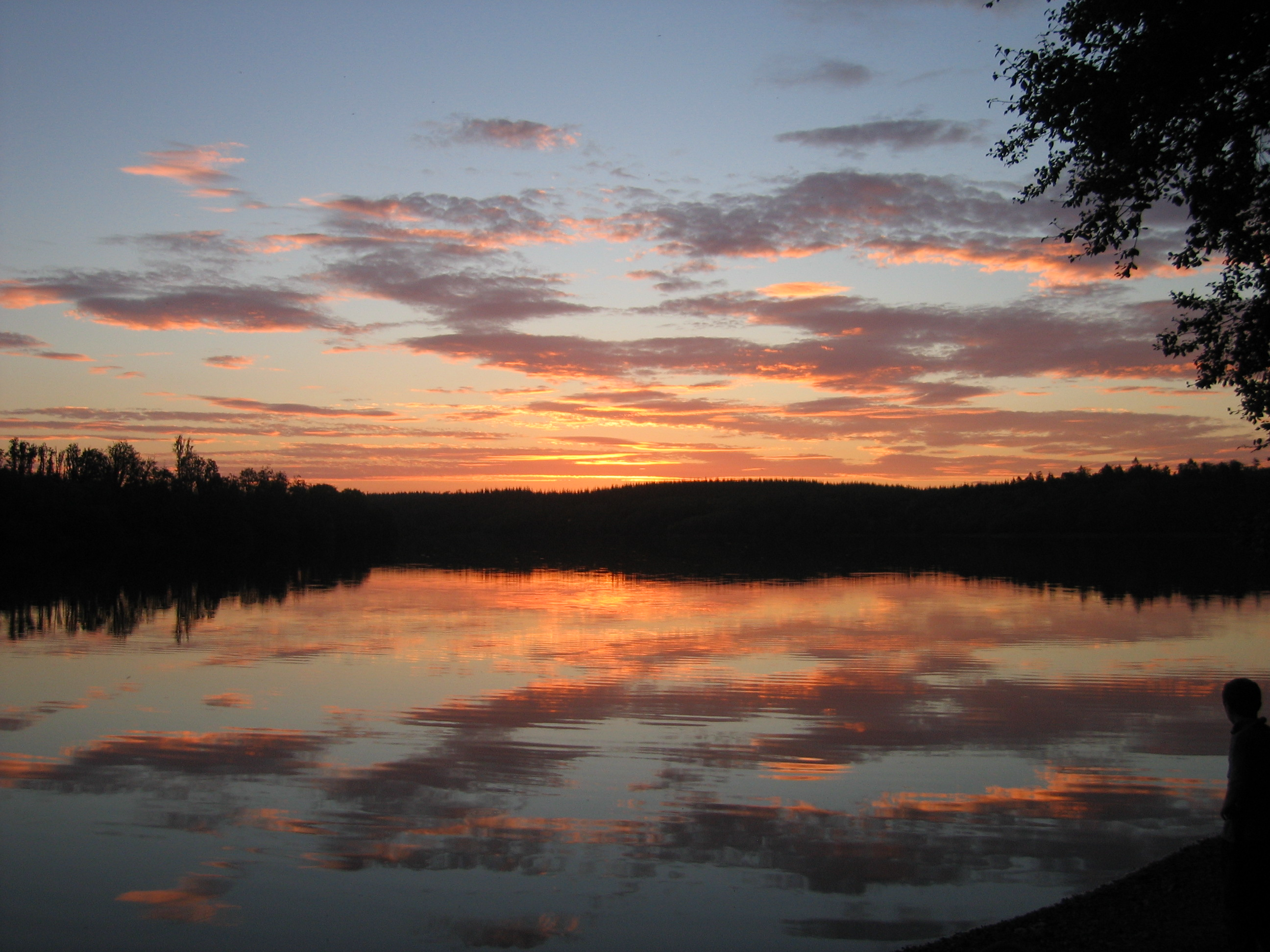
Killykeen,
County Cavan

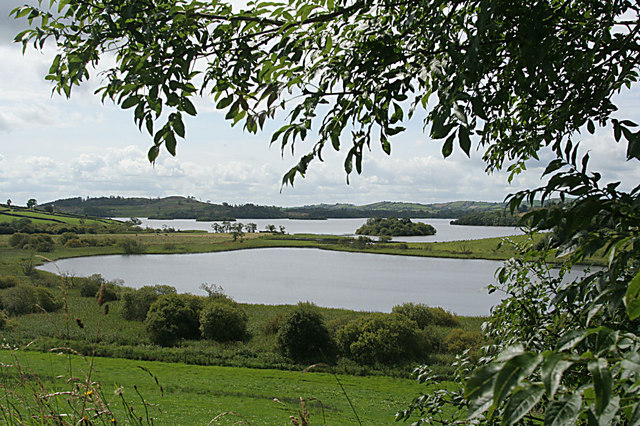
Lough Muckno,
County Monaghan

== Transport ==
=== Air ===
The Border Region is the only region in Ireland which is not serviced by the motorway network.

The Border Region contains one commercially operating airport, Donegal Airport at Carrickfinn in The Rosses, which services 45,000 passengers annually. Just outside the region is City of Derry Airport, located in Eglinton in County Londonderry, which is used by many people living in East Donegal and Inishowen, and Ireland West Airport, located in County Mayo, very near to Counties Sligo and Leitrim. In addition, Sligo Airport is a small regional airport at Strandhill, but operates no regularly scheduled flights. The Irish Defence Forces utilise a military landing strip at Finner Camp in South Donegal.

=== Rail ===
In terms of both road and rail, the Border Region is the most poorly serviced region in the country. Iarnród Éireann operate a Dublin–Sligo railway line which also serves Carrick-on-Shannon. The Sligo, Leitrim and Northern Counties Railway was the main rail line operating in part of the region, before shutting down in 1957. The Donegal Railway Company, and after that the County Donegal Railways Joint Committee, managed much of the extensive rail networks that were built throughout County Donegal in late 19th and early 20th centuries. The Great Northern Railway (GNR) closed its line in East Donegal in 1965, meaning County Donegal has had no 'mainline' operational railways since that time. Similarly, County Monaghan is the only other county within the Republic of Ireland with no existing commercial or freight railway lines. The nearest fully operational railway station to County Donegal is Waterside Station in Derry, operated by Northern Ireland Railways (N.I.R.).

=== Road ===
The Border Region is the only region in the Republic of Ireland with no access to the national motorway network. Former Border Region county Louth had the M1, which runs from Dublin to Dundalk. Transport links with Cavan have been improved substantially with the construction of the M3, however it only goes as far as Kells in County Meath, before reverting into the N3 dual carriageway.

The region is served by the following national primary roads:

National Primary Roads that Serve the Border Region
Road Name	Description	Length
	Dublin – Monaghan – (A5 Omagh – Derry)	133.01 km (82.65 mi)
	Dublin – Cavan – Ballyshannon	127.39 km (79.16 mi)
	Dublin – Sligo	198.21 km (123.16 mi)
	Monaghan – Border (Ardgonnell Bridge) – (A3 to Belfast)	6.87 km (4.27 mi)
	(N15 from Sligo) – Stranorlar – Letterkenny – (A2 to Derry, A6, M22, M2 to Belfast)	43.76 km (27.19 mi)
	Letterkenny – Lifford – (A38 to Strabane)	17.48 km (10.86 mi)
	Sligo – Donegal – Lifford – (A38, A5 to Derry)	110.99 km (68.97 mi)
	Sligo – (A4 to Enniskillen, A4, M1 to Belfast)	47.49 km (29.51 mi)
	Galway – Claremorris – Collooney – (N4 to Sligo)	122.85 km (76.34 mi)
