= Mid-East Region, Ireland =

Region of the Republic of Ireland

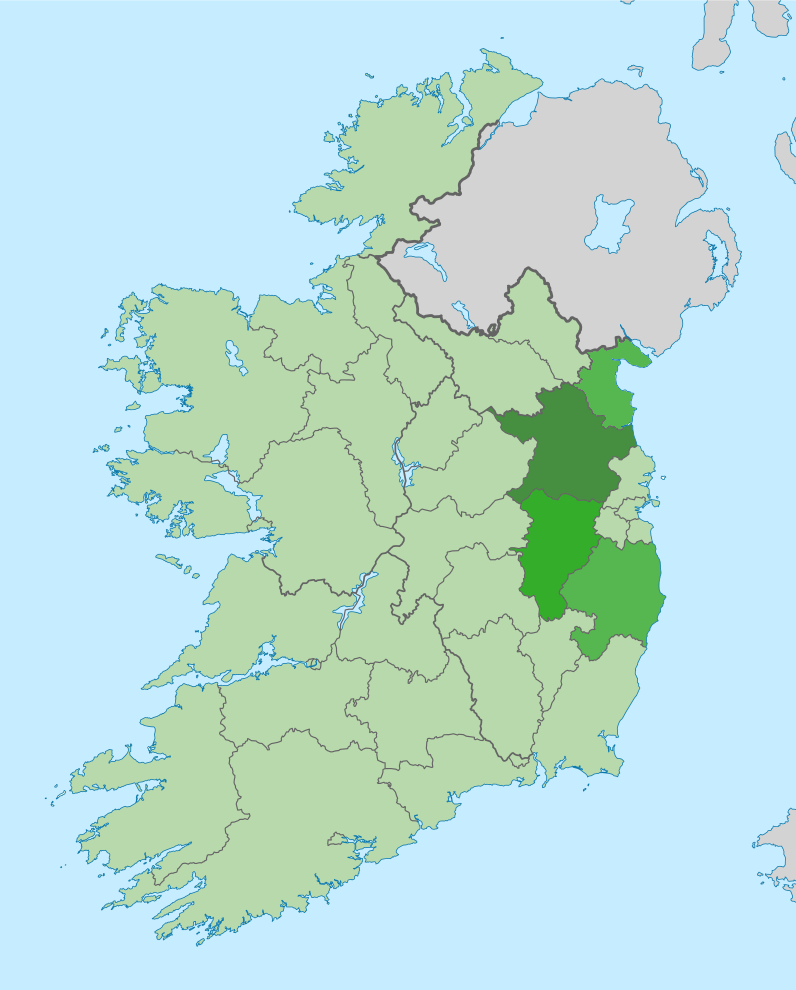
The Mid-East Region of Ireland with each constituent county highlighted

The Mid-East Region (coded IE062) is a NUTS Level III statistical region of Ireland. It consists of the territory of the counties of Kildare, Louth, Meath and Wicklow. The Mid-East spans 6,891 km^{2}, 9.8% of the total area of the state (roughly 7% of the Island) and, according to the 2022 census, had a population of 764,154, roughly 14.84% of the national population.

From 1994 to 2014, the region was governed by the Mid-East Regional Authority. As of 2015, it is a strategic planning area within the Eastern and Midland Regional Assembly.

The Mid-East has experienced continuous population growth since 1961. This growth is primarily influenced by the regions close proximity to Dublin. The region has large urban areas and contains more than 25 towns with a population of over 5,000. But the region mostly has a rural landscape and the total area of viable agricultural land in the Mid-East is 69%. The manufacturing industry employs a significant number of people in the region and it is the location of high tech industries in areas such as Leixlip and Bray.

The region contains notable tourist attractions such as Trim Castle, Kildare Cathedral, Brú na Bóinne and Glendalough. Prominent geographical features include the River Liffey, the Wicklow Mountains and the Curragh of Kildare which is a major centre of stud farming.

== Former Regional Authority ==
The Mid-East Region, 2003-2018

From 1994, the Mid-East Region was administered by the Mid-East Regional Authority. The authority consisted of 21 elected representatives including the region's representative on the EU Committee of the Regions. These representatives met once a month and were nominated from the region's three local authorities:

- Kildare County Council
- Meath County Council
- Wicklow County Council

The Regional Authorities were dissolved in 2014 and their functions were transferred to the Regional Assemblies.

== Territory ==
From 1 January 2015, it has corresponded to the Eastern strategic planning area within the Eastern and Midland Regional Assembly.

The local government areas in the Mid-East are:

- County Kildare
- County Louth
- County Meath
- County Wicklow

=== Territorial change ===
Under an EU revision to NUTS designations in 2018, County Louth was transferred from the Border Region to the Mid-East Region, increasing the number of Mid-East counties from 3 to 4. Due to its position along the Dublin–Belfast corridor and strong economic ties with the Greater Dublin Area, Louth was removed from the Border Region despite sharing a border with Northern Ireland. These changes had a number of implications. Although the least populous county in the Mid-East, the region's two largest towns are now Drogheda and Dundalk, which are both in County Louth, and are Ireland's 6th and 7th largest towns respectively. With the addition of Louth, the Mid-East Region now also shares a border with Northern Ireland.

== Demographics ==
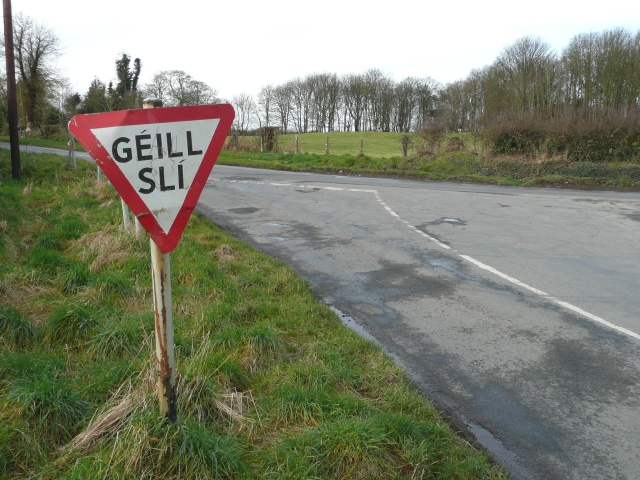
Irish language roadsign in Baile Ghib, County Meath

The Mid-East is the second fastest growing region in Ireland after Dublin. All four counties in the Mid-East have population growth rates well above the national average of 3.7%. The Greater Dublin Area refers to Dublin and its three surrounding counties, Meath, Kildare and Wicklow, and contains 40% of the population of the state. Since the 2018 boundary changes, the population of Dublin and the Mid-East combined now stands at over 2 million.

County	Area (km2)	Population	% of region pop.	Change 2016-2022
Kildare	1,695	222,130	32.42%	**11.54%**
Louth	826	139,703	18.28%	**8.39%**
Meath	2,342	220,282	28.89%	**13.27%**
Wicklow	2,027	155,581	20.39%	**9.49%**

According to the 2022 census, the Mid-East had a population of 764,154, which constitutes 14.84% of the national population. Its population density was 100 persons per km, the second highest in the country. Kildare is the largest county in the Mid-East by population, and Meath is the largest by land area. Louth is the region's smallest county by both population and area.

The Mid-East contains Leinster's only Gaeltacht areas, both located in County Meath, at Ráth Chairn and Baile Ghib. They were founded by emigrants from County Galway in 1935 and 1937 respectively. With just 1,771 native Irish speakers between them, spread over a total area of 44km2, they are the two smallest Gaeltachts in Ireland. According to the 2016 Census, the percentage of Irish speakers by county in the Mid-East is: Kildare (40.2%), Meath (38.6%), Wicklow (36.6%) and Louth (34.1%). Louth has the lowest percentage of Irish speakers of any county in Ireland.

The region has many large urban areas and contains 27 towns with a population of over 5,000 (11 in Kildare, 8 in Meath, 5 in Wicklow and 3 in Louth), 17 of which have a population of over 10,000.

=== Major settlements ===
A list of the ten largest settlements in the mid-east. County capitals are included and are shown in bold.

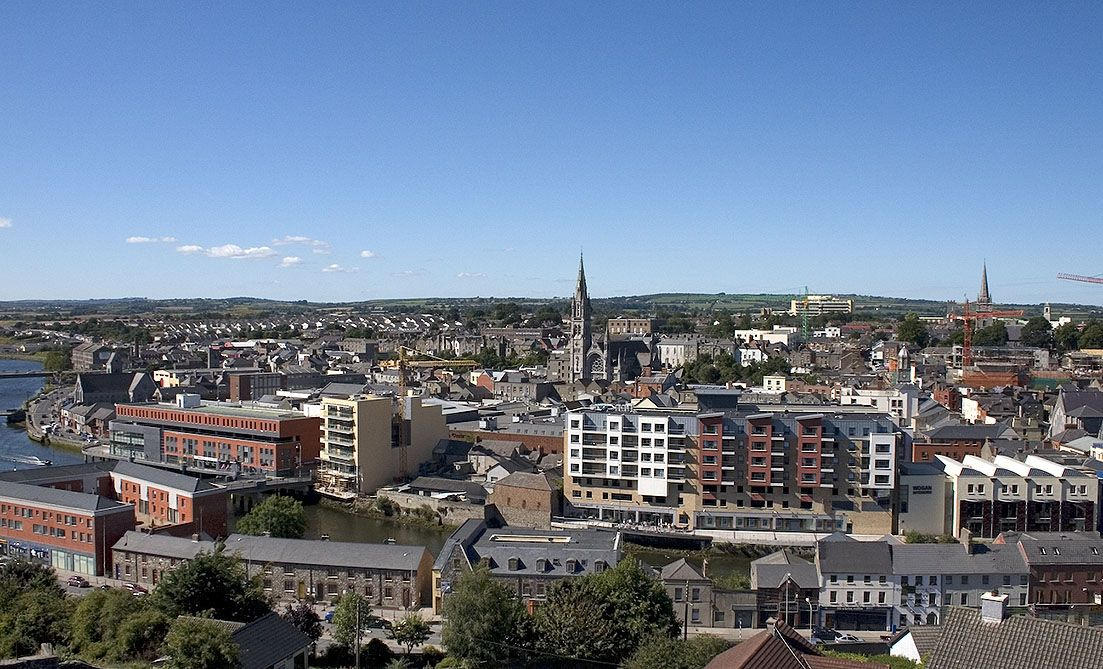
Drogheda, County Louth

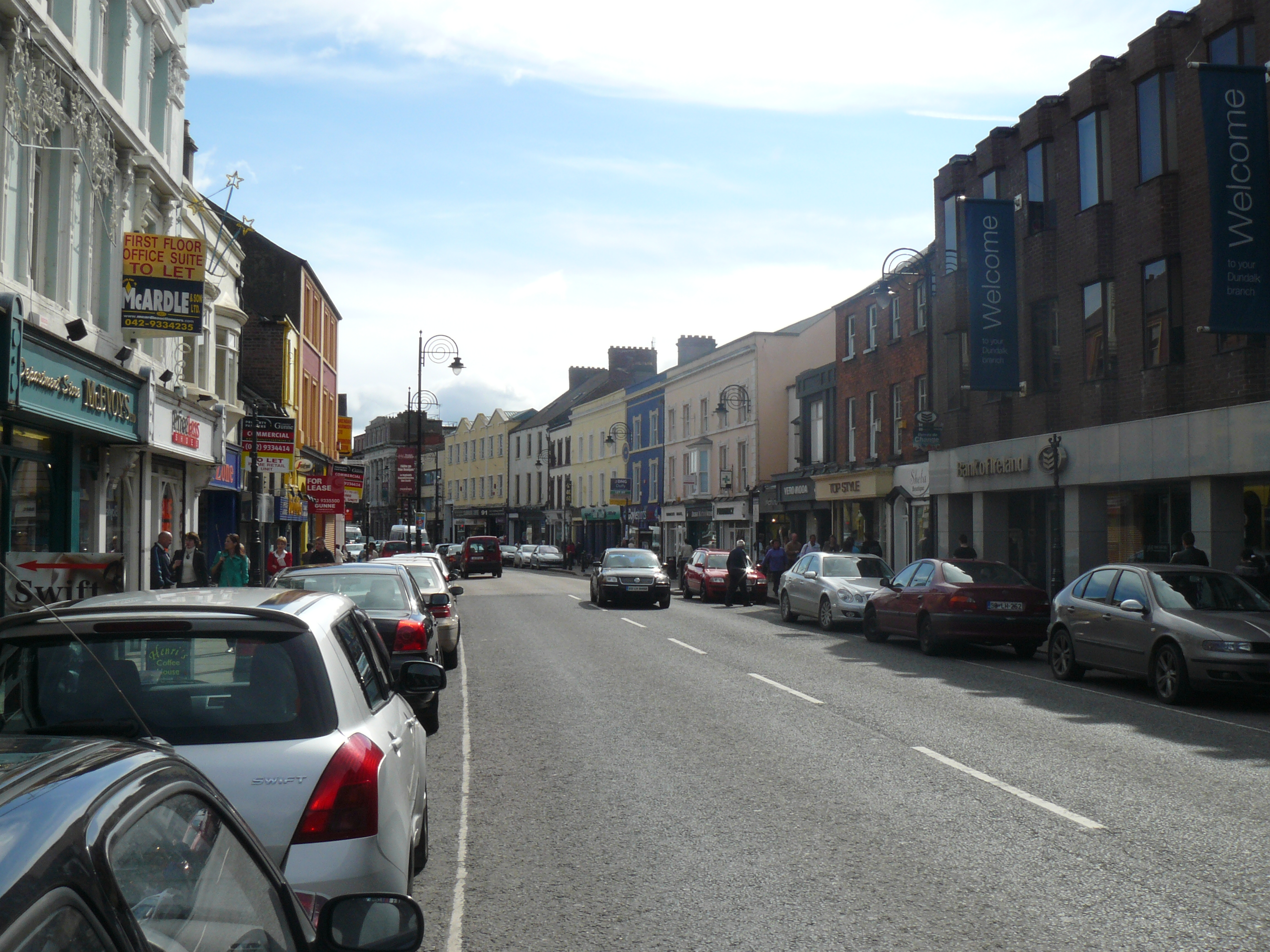
Dundalk, County Louth

Towns
Rank	Town	County	Population (2022 census)
1	Drogheda	Louth & Meath	44,135
2	**Dundalk**	Louth	43,112
3	**Navan**	Meath	33,886
4	Bray	Wicklow & Dublin	33,512
5	**Naas**	Kildare	26,180
6	Newbridge	Kildare	24,366
7	Greystones-Delgany	Wicklow	22,009
8	Celbridge	Kildare	20,601
9	Maynooth	Kildare	17,259
10	Leixlip	Kildare	16,733

== Economy ==
According to Eurostat figures for 2012, the region has GDP of €13,316 bn and a GDP per capita of €24,700. Figures released in February 2017, suggest that the unemployment rate in the region was 5.3% during 2016 - the lowest among other regions of the country.
