= Town council (Ireland) =

Former local government structure in Ireland

- Category: Local authority
- Location: Ireland
- Found in: County
- Created by: Local Government Act 2001
- Created: 2002
- Abolished by: Local Government Reform Act 2014
- Abolished: 2014
- Possible types: Town council; Borough council
- Possible status: Former urban district; Former town commissioners

In Ireland, a town council was the second (or lower) tier of local government from 2002 to 2014.

Operating in smaller towns and cities, they exercised limited functions which were subsidiary to those of their relevant county council. The term was introduced into local government in Ireland by the Local Government Act 2001. From 1 January 2002 the existing urban district councils and boards of town commissioners became town councils. The city of Kilkenny, along with the four boroughs of Sligo, Drogheda, Clonmel, and Wexford, had the same status under the new legislation as towns; however, they had borough councils as successors to the previous borough corporations. There were 75 other town councils in addition to these five borough councils. Outside the towns, the county councils were solely responsible for local services.

On 16 October 2012, the Department of the Environment, Community and Local Government published Putting People First, an "action plan for effective local government". This recommended the abolition of town councils. The town councils were abolished in June 2014 under the Local Government Reform Act 2014.

== Town councils (2002–2014) ==
Town council	County	Previous status
Ardee	County Louth	Town commissioners
Arklow	County Wicklow	Urban district
Athlone	County Westmeath	Urban district
Athy	County Kildare	Urban district
Balbriggan	Fingal	Town commissioners
Ballina	County Mayo	Urban district
Ballinasloe	County Galway	Urban district
Ballybay	County Monaghan	Town commissioners
Ballyshannon	County Donegal	Town commissioners
Bandon	County Cork	Town commissioners
Bantry	County Cork	Town commissioners
Belturbet	County Cavan	Town commissioners
Boyle	County Roscommon	Town commissioners
Birr	County Offaly	Urban district
Bray	County Wicklow	Urban district
Buncrana	County Donegal	Urban district
Bundoran	County Donegal	Urban district
Carlow	County Carlow	Urban district
Carrickmacross	County Monaghan	Urban district
Carrick-on-Suir	South Tipperary	Urban district
Cashel	South Tipperary	Urban district
Castlebar	County Mayo	Urban district
Castleblayney	County Monaghan	Urban district
Cavan	County Cavan	Urban district
Clonakilty	County Cork	Urban district
Clones	County Monaghan	Urban district
Cobh	County Cork	Urban district
Cootehill	County Cavan	Town commissioners
Dundalk	County Louth	Urban district
Dungarvan	County Waterford	Urban district
Edenderry	County Offaly	Town commissioners
Ennis	County Clare	Urban district
Enniscorthy	County Wexford	Urban district
Fermoy	County Cork	Urban district
Gorey	County Wexford	Town commissioners
Granard	County Longford	Town commissioners
Greystones	County Wicklow	Town commissioners
Kells	County Meath	Urban district
Kilkee	County Clare	Town commissioners
Killarney	County Kerry	Urban district
Kilrush	County Clare	Urban district
Kinsale	County Cork	Urban district
Leixlip	County Kildare	Town commissioners
Letterkenny	County Donegal	Urban district
Lismore	County Waterford	Town commissioners
Listowel	County Kerry	Urban district
Longford	County Longford	Urban district
Loughrea	County Galway	Town commissioners
Macroom	County Cork	Urban district
Mallow	County Cork	Urban district
Midleton	County Cork	Urban district
Monaghan	County Monaghan	Urban district
Mountmellick	County Laois	Town commissioners
Muine Bheag	County Carlow	Town commissioners
Mullingar	County Westmeath	Town commissioners
Naas	County Kildare	Urban district
Navan	County Meath	Urban district
Nenagh	North Tipperary	Urban district
Newbridge	County Kildare	Town commissioners
New Ross	County Wexford	Urban district
Passage West	County Cork	Town commissioners
Portlaoise	County Laois	Town commissioners
Shannon	County Clare	Town commissioners
Skibbereen	County Cork	Urban district
Templemore	North Tipperary	Urban district
Thurles	North Tipperary	Urban district
Tipperary	South Tipperary	Urban district
Tralee	County Kerry	Urban district
Tramore	County Waterford	Town commissioners
Trim	County Meath	Urban district
Tuam	County Galway	Town commissioners
Tullamore	County Offaly	Urban district
Westport	County Mayo	Urban district
Wicklow	County Wicklow	Urban district
Youghal	County Cork	Urban district

== Borough councils (2002–2014) ==
Borough	County
Clonmel	South Tipperary
Drogheda	County Louth
Kilkenny	County Kilkenny
Sligo	County Sligo
Wexford	County Wexford

== Establishing and dissolving town councils ==
Under Section 185 of the 2001 Act, new town councils could be established in any town with a population of at least 7,500. The application had to be made by at least 100 local government electors, or 10% of the electors of the proposed town, whichever is the greater. After a period of public consultation, the application was considered by the county council for the area in which the town is situated. The county council's recommendation was referred to the Local Government Commission. If the commission approved the establishment of a town council, an order signed by the Minister for the Environment, Community and Local Government formally created the new council. Under Section 187 of the same act, a town council could apply to the minister to be dissolved.

No town council was abolished or dissolved in the twelve years the structure was in place.

== Elected members ==
Elections were held to town councils every five years. Towns were not subdivided for local elections, being treated as a single constituency. Councillors were elected by the system of proportional representation by means of the single transferable vote. The towns of Bray, Dundalk and Tralee had twelve elected members, all other towns had nine. A town council with nine members could apply for the number to be increased to twelve if the population was greater than 15,000 at the previous census.

== Titles of chairpersons ==
The chairperson and deputy of a town council were designated as Cathaoirleach and Leas-Chathaoirleach respectively. However, Schedule 8 of the Local Government Act 2001 allowed alternative titles for the individuals elected to chair town councils, namely:

- In the Irish language Méara Bhaile ....... and Leas-Mhéara Bhaile ....... followed by the name of the town in Irish
- In the English language Mayor of the Town of ....... and Deputy Mayor of the Town of ....... followed by the name of the town in English

== See also ==
- Twentieth Amendment of the Constitution of Ireland
