= 2016 census of Ireland =

Irish population census in 2016

Census of Ireland, 2016
- 2016

General information
- Country: Ireland
- Topics: Census topics: Population change; Geographical distribution; Age and sex composition; Households and families; Diversity; Ethnicity and Irish Travellers; The Irish language/An Ghaeilge; Religion; Housing
- Authority: Central Statistics Office
- Website: https://census.ie (archived)

Results
- Total population: 4,761,865 (3.8%▲)
- Most populous county: Dublin (1,345,402)
- Least populous county: Leitrim (32,044)

The 2016 census of Ireland was held Sunday, 24th April 2016. It was organised by the Central Statistics Office (CSO) and reported a total population of 4,761,865, or a 3.8% increase since the prior 2011 census. This was the lowest recorded population growth rate since the 1991 census, with the decline in population growth rates attributed to both lower birth rates and lower net migration. The census results were released gradually between April and December 2017 in a series of reports organised either as summaries or in-depth results of specific themes, like age, ethnicity, or religion.

The following census took place in April 2022, having been delayed for one year due to the COVID-19 pandemic.

== Background ==
Although Irish law does not prescribe a regular interval for administering censuses, Census 2016 was held in accordance with Irish government tradition since 1951 to administer a census on a Sunday in April on years ending with the numbers '1' or '6'. This incidentally coincided with the centenary of the 1916 Easter Rising, which began on Easter Monday, 24 April 1916.

Responsibility for organising the census fell with the Central Statistics Office, which operates within the Department of the Taoiseach. The CSO hired 4,660 enumerators, supported by 430 field supervisors, who reported in turn to 44 regional supervisors. In delivering over two million census forms, enumerators were required to make personal contact with a resident at the property.

== Census form ==
Census 2016 was the first Irish census that allowed respondents to report a marital status contracted with a person of the same sex. This followed a 2015 referendum to amend the Irish Constitution to permit same-sex marriages, which was passed into law by the Marriage Act 2015. Other than marital status, the 2016 census form copied all questions verbatim from the 2011 census form. The same was not planned for the 2022 census, which underwent a public consultation process in 2017 to formulate new questions. These changes included a revision to questions on religion, which Atheist Ireland argued skewed responses towards religiosity. The new questions were trialed in West Cork in 2018.

Although most census forms in 2016 were collected in person by returning enumerators, over 15,000 forms were returned by post, with all recipients legally required to return completed forms.

== Results ==
The census's results on declining religiosity, the aging population, and rising homelessness all drew attention in Irish media. Affiliation with the largest religion in Ireland, Roman Catholicism, dropped to 78%, down from 84% in 2011. The census also reported the first ever recorded fall in the absolute number of Roman Catholics. A thematic report on housing found that home ownership rates reached their lowest since 1971, which Minister for Housing, Planning, Community and Local Government Simon Coveney described as a "stark story" emanating from "fundamental structural problems", which he associated with the Great Recession and Irish housing bubble.

=== Population change ===
While Ireland's population continued to grow in the 2011–2016 period, the decline in growth rates was noted by multiple outlets and the CSO's reporting.

==== Province ====
Population and population change in the Republic of Ireland by Province
Rank	Province	Population as of 2011 census	Population as of 2016 census	Change	Percent change
1	Leinster	2,504,814	2,630,720	125,906 ▲	5.03% ▲
2	Munster	1,246,088	1,280,394	34,306 ▲	2.75% ▲
3	Connaught	542,547	550,742	8,195 ▲	1.51% ▲
4	Ulster (Note: Includes the three counties of Cavan, Donegal, and Monaghan, with six further Ulster counties within Northern Ireland in the United Kingdom.)	294,803	296,120	1,317 ▲	0.45% ▲

==== Region and county ====
The local government area with the highest percentage growth rate was Fingal (8.1%▲), while Dublin city had the largest population increase (+26,942). Of Ireland's traditional counties, the largest overall population increase was in Dublin (+74,799), while both Dublin and Meath were jointly the fastest growing counties (5.9%▲). Three counties declined in population: Sligo (−0.1%▼), Mayo (−0.2%▼), and Donegal (−1.2%▼).

Population by region and local government area
Region/county/city	2016 pop.	2011 pop.	Change	Percent change
Border	394,333	391,992	2,341	0.6%
Cavan	76,176	73,183	2,993	4.0%
Donegal	159,192	161,137	−1,945	−1.2%
Leitrim	32,044	31,796	248	0.5%
Monaghan	61,386	60,483	903	1.3%
Sligo	65,535	65,393	−142	−0.1%
Dublin	1,345,402	1,270,603	74,799	5.9%
Dublin city	554,554	527,612	26,942	4.9%
Dún Laoghaire–Rathdown	218,018	206,261	11,757	5.3%
Fingal	296,020	273,991	22,029	8.1%
South Dublin	278,767	265,205	13,562	5.1%
Mid-East	688,857	653,984	34,873	5.3%
Kildare	222,504	210,312	12,192	5.6%
Louth	128,884	122,897	5,987	4.5%
Meath	195,044	184,135	10,909	5.9%
Wicklow	142,425	136,640	5,785	4.2%
Mid-West	473,269	467,759	5,510	1.2%
Clare	118,817	117,196	1,621	1.2%
Limerick	194,899	191,809	3,090	1.8%
Tipperary	159,553	158,754	799	1.1%
Midland	292,301	282,410	9,891	3.5%
Laois	84,697	80,559	4,138	5.2%
Longford	40,873	39,000	1,873	4.6%
Offaly	77,961	76,687	1,274	1.7%
Westmeath	88,770	86,164	2,606	2.9%
South-East	422,062	409,146	12,916	3.2%
Carlow	56,932	54,612	2,320	4.1%
Kilkenny	99,232	95,419	3,813	3.9%
Waterford	116,176	113,795	2,381	2.3%
Wexford	149,722	145,320	4,402	2.9%
South-West	690,575	664,534	26,041	3.9%
Cork city	125,657	119,230	6,427	5.4%
Cork county	417,211	399,802	17,409	4.4%
Kerry	147,707	145,502	2,205	1.4%
West	453,109	445,244	7,865	1.8%
Galway city	78,668	75,529	3,139	4.2%
Galway county	179,390	175,124	4,266	2.4%
Mayo	130,507	130,638	−131	−0.2%
Roscommon	64,544	64,065	479	0.6%

== See also ==
- Demographics of the Republic of Ireland
- Irish population analysis
