= Mid-West Region, Ireland =

Mid-West
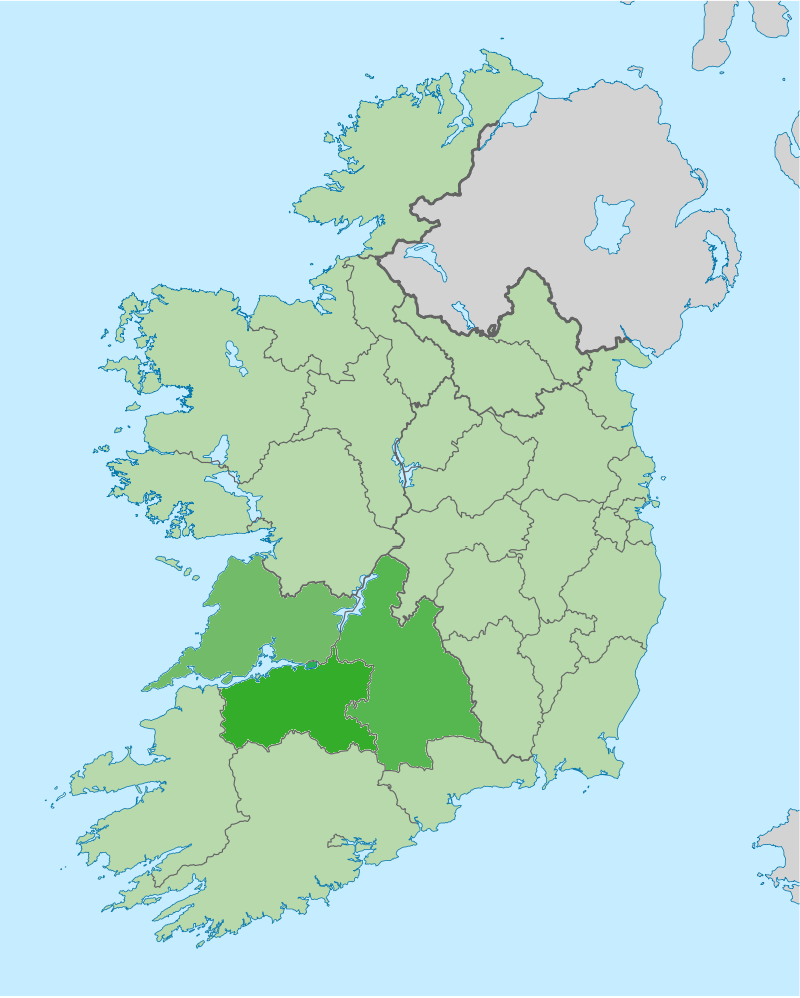
- The Mid-West of Ireland with each constituent county council highlighted.
- Country: Ireland
- Region: Southern

The Mid-West is a strategic planning area within the Southern Region in Ireland. It is a NUTS Level III statistical region of Ireland (coded IE051). It consists of the counties of Clare and Tipperary, and the city and county of Limerick. Limerick City is the economic centre of the region. It spans 10,511 km^{2}, 14.95% of the total area of the state and as of the 2022 census, it had a population of 505,369.

== Area ==
The constituent local authorities are the councils of the counties of Clare and Tipperary and the city and county of Limerick, which each send representatives to the Southern Regional Assembly, forming the Mid-West Strategic Planning Area Committee.

The area of the Mid-West was expanded in 2018 as part of an EU-wide revision to NUTS areas, by the inclusion of the whole of County Tipperary. This reflected the merger of North Tipperary and South Tipperary as local government areas in 2014. Prior to 2018, South Tipperary was located in the South-East.

=== Former Regional Authority ===
Prior to 2014, the area was a region was administered by the Mid-West Regional Authority, which consisted of 26 elected representatives from the region's councils. These representatives met once a month. The councils were:

- Clare County Council (7)
- Limerick City Council (6)
- Limerick County Council (7)
- North Tipperary County Council (6)

The Regional Authorities were dissolved in 2014 and were replaced by Regional Assemblies.

Shannon Development was a development body for the Shannon Region of the lower River Shannon, which encompassed the entire Mid-West Region together with North Kerry (in the South-West Region) and South Offaly (in the Midland Region). It too was dissolved in 2014.

== Demographics ==
The Mid-West has a population of 473,269 which constitutes about 9.94% of Ireland's total population.

The population density of the region is 45.02 persons/km^{2}. Limerick City is the largest urban area in the region with a population of 102,000 people within the larger urban area including the city suburbs.

== Economy ==
The economy of the region is based mainly around the greater Limerick/Shannon corridor. The Shannon Free Zone, Shannon Airport, Shannon Estuary Ports, National Technology Park Limerick and major educational institutions such as the University of Limerick and Limerick Institute of Technology are major drivers of the regional economy with growth prospects in Biotechnology and medical technology, ICT, aerospace, tourism agribusiness and logistics. The Dublin/Limerick corridor and the western corridor linking Galway/Ennis/Limerick/Cork is of strategic importance to the region.

According to CSO figures for 2014, the region has a GDP of €12.116 bn and a GDP per capita of €31,792.

Eurostat figures for 2012, the region has GDP of €11.468 bn and a GDP per capita of €30,300

The 2016 unemployment rate is one of the lowest in Ireland at 6% (the same as that of Dublin). .

The workforce in the region was 160,400 in 2003 which was an employment rate of 96.7% of which 61.8% were employed in services, 29.8% in Industry and 8.3% employed in agriculture.

Agriculture remains a major part of the Mid-West economy. The Clare Marts in Ennis is a major trading post of livestock nationally. The plains of East Limerick are part of Ireland's Golden Vale that stretch from Limerick City into County Tipperary

According to the CSO, the mid-west in 2016 had the lowest value of land sold in Ireland of €16.5 million. Also, the Mid-West region had the lowest volume of land in Ireland of 2,898 acres which could in turn reduce income coming into this region.

== Transport ==
Shannon Airport is the only airport in the region with a wide range of flights available to Britain, continental Europe and transatlantic flights to the United States. The M7 is a high quality motorway connecting Dublin and Limerick. The N18/M18 including the Limerick Tunnel provides a complete bypass of Limerick and improved access to Shannon, Ennis and Galway. The N/M20 road/motorway provides access to Cork and Kerry.

== Urban areas ==
A list of the largest urban areas and regionally important towns with a population of 1,000 or more in the Mid-West Region. County capitals are shown in bold.

Rank	Town	County	Population (2016 census)
1	**Limerick**	Limerick	94,192
2	**Ennis**	Clare	25,276
3	**Clonmel**	Tipperary	17,140
4	Shannon	Clare	9,729
5	**Nenagh**	Tipperary	8,968
6	Thurles	Tipperary	7,940
7	Newcastle West	Limerick	6,619
8	Carrick-on-Suir	Tipperary	5,771
9	Roscrea	Tipperary	5,446
10	Tipperary	Tipperary	4,979
11	Cashel	Tipperary	4,422
12	Cahir	Tipperary	3,593
13	Annacotty	Limerick	2,930
14	Kilrush	Clare	2,719
15	Ballina	Tipperary	2,632
16	Sixmilebridge	Clare	2,625
17	Castleconnell	Limerick	2,107
18	Abbeyfeale	Limerick	2,023
19	Newport	Tipperary	1,995
20	Templemore	Tipperary	1,939
21	Newmarket-on-Fergus	Clare	1,784
22	Kilmallock	Limerick	1,668
23	Fethard	Tipperary	1,545
24	Killaloe	Clare	1,484
25	Caherconlish	Limerick	1,476
26	Rathkeale	Limerick	1,441
27	Ardnacrusha	Clare	1,383
28	Murroe	Limerick	1,377
29	Croom	Limerick	1,159
30	Askeaton	Limerick	1,137
31	Adare	Limerick	1,129
32	Ennistymon	Clare	1,045
