= 2011 census of Ireland =

Irish population census in 2011

Census of Ireland, 2011
← 2006	10 April 2011	2016 →

General information
- Country: Ireland

Results
- Total population: 4,588,252 (▲6.86%)
- Most populous county: Dublin (1,273,069)
- Least populous county: Leitrim (31,796)

The 2011 census of Ireland was held on Sunday, 10 April 2011. It was administered by the Central Statistics Office of Ireland and found the population to be 4,588,252 people. Before the census, the latest population estimate was published in September 2010 and calculated that the Irish population had been 4,470,700 in April 2010. The previous census took place five years earlier, on Sunday, 23 April 2006. The subsequent census took place five years later, on 24 April 2016.

The 2011 census was held during the same year as the 2011 United Kingdom census in which the Northern Ireland Statistics and Research Agency administered a census of Northern Ireland, covering those areas of the island that are not part of the Republic of Ireland.

== Preparation ==
The Central Statistics Office carried out a census pilot survey on 19 April 2009 to test new questions and methods for the 2011 census. The Irish government met on 11 December 2009 and scheduled the census to take place on 10 April 2011. The meeting also defined the questions that would be asked in the questionnaire.

== Atheist Ireland and Humanist Association campaigns ==
There were also campaigns by the Atheist Ireland group, and by The Humanist Association of Ireland, asking people to consider carefully their answer to the question about religion.

== Recruitment ==
The Central Statistics Office hired a temporary field force of 5,500 people. The recruitment was performed in a pyramid structure, with 50 senior managers, 440 field supervisors, and 5,000 enumerators hired in succession. Hiring of senior managers for the census took place between 29 April and 12 May 2010. Recruitment of 440 census field supervisor positions began on 16 September 2010. The supervisors worked from their own homes around the country for a six-month contract. The 5,000 census enumerator positions were advertised on 29 December 2010, and these worked for ten weeks from 8 March 2011.

== Field work ==
Enumerators began a field campaign on 10 March 2011 to deliver about 1.8 million census forms to every household in Ireland in the month before Census Day. Following the census, the forms were collected between 11 April and 9 May 2011.

== Questions on the census form ==
Household questions
H1	What type of accommodation does your household occupy?
H2	When was your house, flat or apartment first built?
H3	Does your household own or rent your accommodation?
H4	If your accommodation is rented, how much rent does your household pay?
H5	How many rooms do you have for use only by your household?
H6	What is the main type of fuel used by the central heating in your accommodation?
H7	What type of piped water supply does your accommodation have?
H8	What type of sewerage facility does your accommodation have?
H9	How many cars or vans are owned or are available for use by one or more members of your household?
H10	Does your household have a personal computer (PC)?
H11	Does your household have access to the Internet?
H12	Go to next page.

Individual questions
1	What is your name?
2	Sex?
3	What is your date of birth?
4	What is your relationship to Persons 1, 2, 3 and 4?
5	What is your current marital status?
6	What is your place of birth?
7	Where do you usually live?
8	Where did you usually live one year ago?
9	Have you lived outside the Republic of Ireland for a continuous period of one year or more?
10	What is your nationality?
11	What is your ethnic or cultural background?
12	What is your religion?
13	How many children have you given birth to?
14	Can you speak Irish?
15	Do you speak a language other than English or Irish at home?
16	Do you have any of the following long-lasting conditions or difficulties?
17	It you answered "Yes" to 16, do you have any difficulty in doing any of the following?
18	How is your health in general?
19	How do you usually travel to work, school or college?
20	What time do you usually leave home to go to work, school or college?
21	How long does your journey to work, school or college usually take?
22	Do you provide regular unpaid personal help for a friend or family member with a long-term illness, health problem or disability?
23	If you are aged under 15 go to Question 34.
24	Have you ceased your full-time education?
25	What is the highest level of education/training (full-time or part-time) which you have completed to date?
26	What is the main field of study of the highest qualification you have completed to date?
27	How would you describe your present principal status?
28	If you are working, unemployed or retired go to Question 29.
	If you are a student go to Question 34.
	Otherwise go to Question 35.
29	Do (did) you work as an employee or are (were) you self-employed in your main job?
30	What is (was) your occupation in your main job?
31	if you are retired go to Question 35.
32	What is (was) the business of your employer at the place where you work(ed) in your main job?
33	If you are unemployed go to Question 35.
34	What is the full name and address of your place of work, school or college?
35	Answer questions for Person 2 starting on the next page. If there is only one person present in the household on the night of 10 April go to page 22.

Absent persons who usually live in the household [page 22]
A1	What is this person's name?
A2	Sex?
A3	What is this person's date of birth?
A4	What is the relationship of this person to Person 1 on page 4?
A5	What is this person's current marital status?
A6	How long altogether is this person away for?
A7	Was this person in the Republic of Ireland on Sunday 10 April?
A8	Is this person a student away at school or college?

== Results ==
The first statistics were released in the Preliminary Population Report on 30 June 2011. The population on Census Night in April was 4,581,269, a figure based on summary counts for each enumeration area compiled by enumerators on the front page of the census forms. This figure was 110,569 more than the estimated population for April 2010. The definitive census publication, based on the scanned and processed census forms, is to be published between March and December 2012.

=== County details ===
The population of each county in the Republic of Ireland recorded by the 2011 Census is listed below. The 26 traditional counties are ranked by population. Non-traditional administrative counties are indicated by a cream-coloured background.

Rank	County	Population	Density (/ km^{2})	Province	Change since previous census
1	Dublin	1,273,069	1,380.8	Leinster	▲7.02%
2	Cork	519,032	69.0	Munster	▲7.84%
-	Fingal	273,991	600.6	Leinster	▲14.17%
-	South Dublin	265,205	1,190.6	Leinster	▲7.40%
3	Galway	250,541	40.7	Connacht	▲8.15%
4	Kildare	210,312	123.8	Leinster	▲12.87%
-	Dún Laoghaire–Rathdown	206,261	1,620.1	Leinster	▲6.30%
5	Limerick	191,809	69.4	Munster	▲4.21%
6	Meath	184,135	78.5	Leinster	▲13.08%
7	Donegal	161,137	32.9	Ulster	▲9.42%
8	Tipperary	158,754	36.8	Munster	▲6.37%
9	Kerry	145,502	30.1	Munster	▲4.05%
10	Wexford	145,320	61.2	Leinster	▲10.30%
11	Wicklow	136,640	67.4	Leinster	▲8.28%
12	Mayo	130,638	23.3	Connacht	▲5.49%
13	Louth	122,897	148.7	Leinster	▲10.45%
14	Clare	117,196	33.8	Munster	▲5.63%
15	Waterford	113,795	61.2	Munster	▲5.40%
16	Kilkenny	95,419	46.0	Leinster	▲8.98%
-	South Tipperary	88,432	39.2	Munster	▲6.26%
17	Westmeath	86,164	46.7	Leinster	▲8.59%
18	Laois	80,559	46.8	Leinster	▲20.13%
19	Offaly	76,687	38.3	Leinster	▲8.21%
20	Cavan	73,183	37.7	Ulster	▲14.34%
-	North Tipperary	70,322	34.4	Munster	▲6.61%
21	Sligo	65,393	35.5	Connacht	▲7.39%
22	Roscommon	64,065	25.0	Connacht	▲9.01%
23	Monaghan	60,483	46.7	Ulster	▲8.01%
24	Carlow	54,612	60.8	Leinster	▲8.47%
25	Longford	39,000	35.7	Leinster	▲13.40%
26	Leitrim	31,796	19.9	Connacht	▲9.84%
	Average	176,471			
Total	Ireland	4,588,252	65.3		▲6.86%
