= An Gleann Is A Raibh Ann =

Irish memoir

- Cover
- Author: Séamus Ó Maolchathaigh
- Language: Tipperary Dialect of Irish
- Genre: Memoir
- Set in: South Tipperary, Ireland
- Publication date: 1950
- Media type: Print
- Pages: 230

An Gleann Is A Raibh Ann is a memoir written in the Tipperary Irish dialect by native Séamus Ó Maolchathaigh about life in rural Ireland.

An Gleann Is A Raibh Ann is the best surviving document of the Irish dialect found in South Tipperary and West Waterford. Ó Maolchathaigh lived in a remote mountainous area of the Knockmealdowns in which Irish survived as a spoken language until the 1940s.

The book depicts life of rural Ireland at the turn of the 20th century, including the customs, folklore, and historical aspects before the language became sparsely spoken.

== History ==
The dialect of Tipperary was predominantly spoken in this Irish county for nearly five hundred years until it slowly dwindled to extinction in the early twentieth century. An Gleann Is A Raibh Ann is the last remaining fragment of this dialect, with the story also encapsulating the workings of old Irish life prior to the contemporary era. Since the language was written down and able to be preserved, it was translated into standardized Irish in 1960 and distributed to the general public.

An Gleann Is A Raibh Ann was retranslated by linguistic researcher Michael Desmond in a project named Oidhreacht An Chaisleáin Nua . A literary festival, Éigse Shéamais Ui Mhaolchataigh, centered around the new translation. It received praise, being noted as an effort to revive the Irish language in this area.

An Gleann Is A Raibh Ann was translated to standardized Irish in 1960 and into English .

=== Cultural attitude ===
An Gleann Is A Raibh Ann's appeal is based on a strong interest in Ireland on dialects, information, and speakers of Irish . Helen McGrath, a founder of Éigse Shéamais Ui Mhaolchataigh, notes, " Locals are really interested in the language and to some degree there is still a lot of Irish in the local dialect. "People used to come here from far and wide when this place had Gaeltacht status until the 1950s and they would stay here with locals to learn Irish. There was money to be made by keeping girls and boys in the village back then", she says."Now there are no households where Irish is the primary language but there is still an interest in the language and you hear it in conversations."

Much of old Irish was passed down through oral traditions, making it difficult to preserve. "The situation is more complex still given the loss of language and culture, the widespread dispersal of people through mass emigration and the silencing of the Irish-language sources – all of which ensures only a very hazy picture of our past."

== Plot summary ==
An Gleann Is A Raibh Ann is an autobiography of Maolchathaigh, who lived in the area from 1884 to 1968. Ó Maolchathaigh's parents were both Irish speakers from Newcastle, South Tipperary. His father was a farm laborer named Thomas Mulcahy and his mother was Margaret Burke. After receiving his education in a traditional school in Newcastle, Ó Maolchathaigh went to a college in De La Salle, Waterford, to train in education. He then returned to New Castle, Tipperary, where he spent 44 years working as a teacher in Grange National School. Apart from this, he published short stories and essays in newspapers and journals such as Scéala Éireann in his dialect . He also translated a French plays into Irish.

Ó Maolchathaigh wrote extensively about family and friends, and tending to animals on farm. He also wrote about crime, greed, mental illness, suicide, and murder. Specifically, during the Irish famine, he mentioned the concept of Irish hitmen who were willing to remove people from particular landholdings in exchange for money so that others could take over the land.

In other parts of his narrative, Ó Maolchathaigh discussed poverty, and describes wanderers and beggars who lodged with local people up until the late 1940s. Some of these people, he noted, had physical or intellectual difficulties and who managed to avoid institutionalization by the government. He noted that this because increasingly common as the 20th century progressed and the new nation-state developed.

== Reception ==
An Gleann Is A Raibh Ann received positive reviews, particularly among scholars of the Irish language.

One English translator of the book likens the significance of this work to humanity and restoring confidence in fragments of history.

The crisis of historical confidence that the last century wreaked on us. We no longer believe in objectivity; we don't trust the history books to tell the story of ourselves, whether because it is too disturbing or merely too mundane. But we are desperate for that story to be told, so we look for our lives that intersect with bits of history that affect us. The great power of this memoir is that, when it works, it touches a common humanity we fear that no longer exists.

— Liam Harte, Modern Irish Autobiography, Self, Nation and Society (2007)
