= Southeast Region =

Southeast Region or South-East Region may refer to:

- Southeast Region, Brazil, region composed by the states of Espírito Santo, Minas Gerais, Rio de Janeiro and São Paulo
- South-East Region, Ireland region composed by counties Carlow, Kilkenny, South Tipperary, Wexford, and Waterford
- South-East Region, Singapore, alternate name for the East Region of Singapore
- Little League World Series (Southeast Region), United States region for the Little League World Series

== See also ==
- Points of the compass
