= South-East Region, Ireland =

NUTS region and strategic planning area in Ireland

South-East
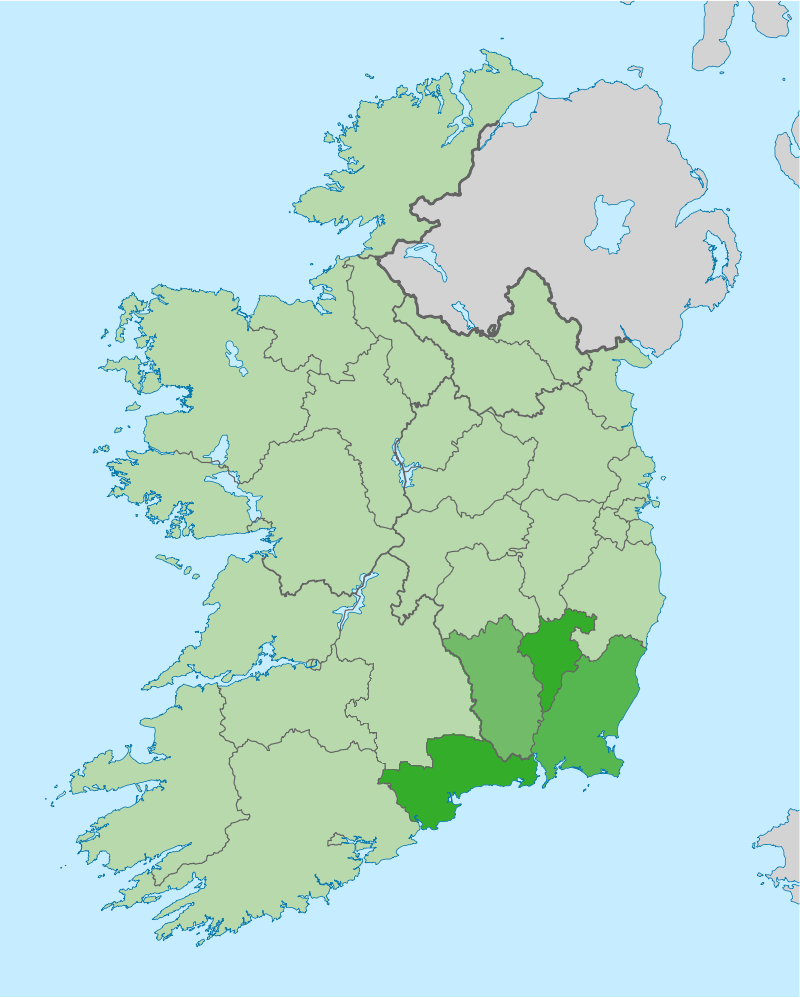
- The South-East region of Ireland with each constituent county highlighted.
- Country: Ireland
- Region: Southern

Population (2022)
  - Total: 456,228

The South-East is a strategic planning area within the Southern Region in Ireland. It is a NUTS Level III statistical region of Ireland (coded IE052). It comprises the counties of Carlow, Kilkenny and Wexford, the city and county of Waterford and formerly South Tipperary. The South-East spans 7,198 km^{2}, 10.2% of the total area of the state and according to the 2016 census had a population of 422,062.

== History and geography ==
Ireland South East has a diverse mix of history – key towns and cities such as Waterford and Wexford have Viking origins, while Kilkenny city grew around a Norman merchant town. In terms of landscape and geography, Ireland South East is home to Europe's longest beaches, a number of mountain ranges (such as the Comeraghs, the Blackstairs and the Galtees) and rivers (such as the Nore, the Suir and the Barrow). It also Ireland's sunniest region and is affectionately known as the "Sunny South East".

The South-East is home to over 16,000 students, as the region includes the Waterford and Carlow campuses of the South East Technological University. It is also home to global company brand names such as Glanbia; Bausch and Lomb; Red Hat; Zurich; Burnside Engineering; and Cartoon Saloon.

The former South-East prior to South Tipperary joining with North Tipperary to form a single administrative county in 2014. South Tipperary is still considered geographically South-Eastern Ireland.

The region consistently scores highly on all quality-of-life metrics. It is known for the diversity and quantity of its festivals such as the Wexford Opera Festival, the Borris House Festival of Literature and Ideas, the Kilkenny Arts Festival and the Spraoi festival.

The region's economy is also strengthened by its good quality transport and economic infrastructure – including 2 international ports (Rosslare Europort); Waterford Airport; a modern motorway network; and close proximity to Dublin.

== Economy ==
The Ireland South-East region has grown steadily over the past decade and has strong economic clusters in engineering, life sciences, financial services, ICT, agrifood and the creative sectors. Eurostat data shows the region as being the 6th fastest-growing region in the EU in terms of job creation (2012–2017) and the 7th fastest growing region in terms of Gross Value Added (GVA) per person.

Ireland South-East represents a place of opportunity for business, careers, investment, and tourism. A qualitative analysis of the company and infrastructural activity in the region also shows continuing positivity, with new job announcements, new investments, and major infrastructural projects underway. The region continues to score well on affordability and quality of life metrics making it an attractive place for talent and investment.

Regional GDP in 2017 was given as €15,513m, with income per person standing at 90.5% of the State average. The 2019 unemployment rate for the region stood at 8.1%.

Tourism in the region is aided by its rich natural, historic and archaeological sites, which attract over 1 million people annually.

== Demography ==
According to the 2022 census, the region had a population of 456,228 which constitutes 8.90% of the national population. Its population density was 58.6 persons per km^{2}. The population of the regional capital, Waterford, was 53,504.

The main urban centres within the region each exceed 17,000 in terms of population with an evenly distributed network of second and third-tier towns. This is also supplemented by a strong rural settlement initiative.

== Major settlements ==
A list of the ten largest settlements in the South-East region. County capitals are included and are shown in bold.

Urban Centres
| Rank | Urban Centres | County | Population (2016 census) |
|---|---|---|---|
| 1 | **Waterford** | Waterford | 53,504 |
| 2 | **Kilkenny** | Kilkenny | 26,512 |
| 3 | **Carlow** | Carlow | 24,272 |
| 4 | **Wexford** | Wexford | 20,188 |
| 5 | Enniscorthy | Wexford | 11,381 |
| 6 | Tramore | Waterford | 10,381 |
| 7 | Gorey | Wexford | 10,366 |
| 8 | Dungarvan | Waterford | 9,227 |
| 9 | New Ross | Wexford | 8,040 |
| 10 | Tullow | Carlow | 4,673 |

== Regional governance ==
The elected representatives of these councils convene at the Southern Regional Assembly for planning and local government purposes, where they form the South-East strategic planning area committee.

A number of local authority changes were made by the Irish government in June 2014; however, these were not reflected in the NUTS 3 statistical units until June 2018, when appropriate updates were made following the implementation of Commission Regulation (EU) 2016/2066. North Tipperary and South Tipperary were unified into a single local government area in 2014; however Tipperary remained divided between two NUTS 3 regions for statistical purposes. In June 2018 Tipperary was transferred in its entirety to the Mid-West Region.

Waterford City Council was merged with Waterford County Council in 2014; however, this too was not reflected at the NUTS 3 level until 2018. Therefore the number of local authorities in the South-East Region was reduced from 6 to 4. Prior to the change, South Tipperary comprised 23.8% of the South-East's land area and 19.1% of its population, making it the region's second largest county by area, and second smallest county by population.

The local authorities in the South-East Region are:

- Carlow County Council
- Kilkenny County Council
- Waterford City and County Council
- Wexford County Council

From 1994 to 2014, the region was governed by the South-East Regional Authority. That body was abolished in June 2014, and from January 2015 it was succeeded by the Southern Regional Assembly.
