= Southern Region, Ireland =

NUTS 2 region in Ireland

- Region
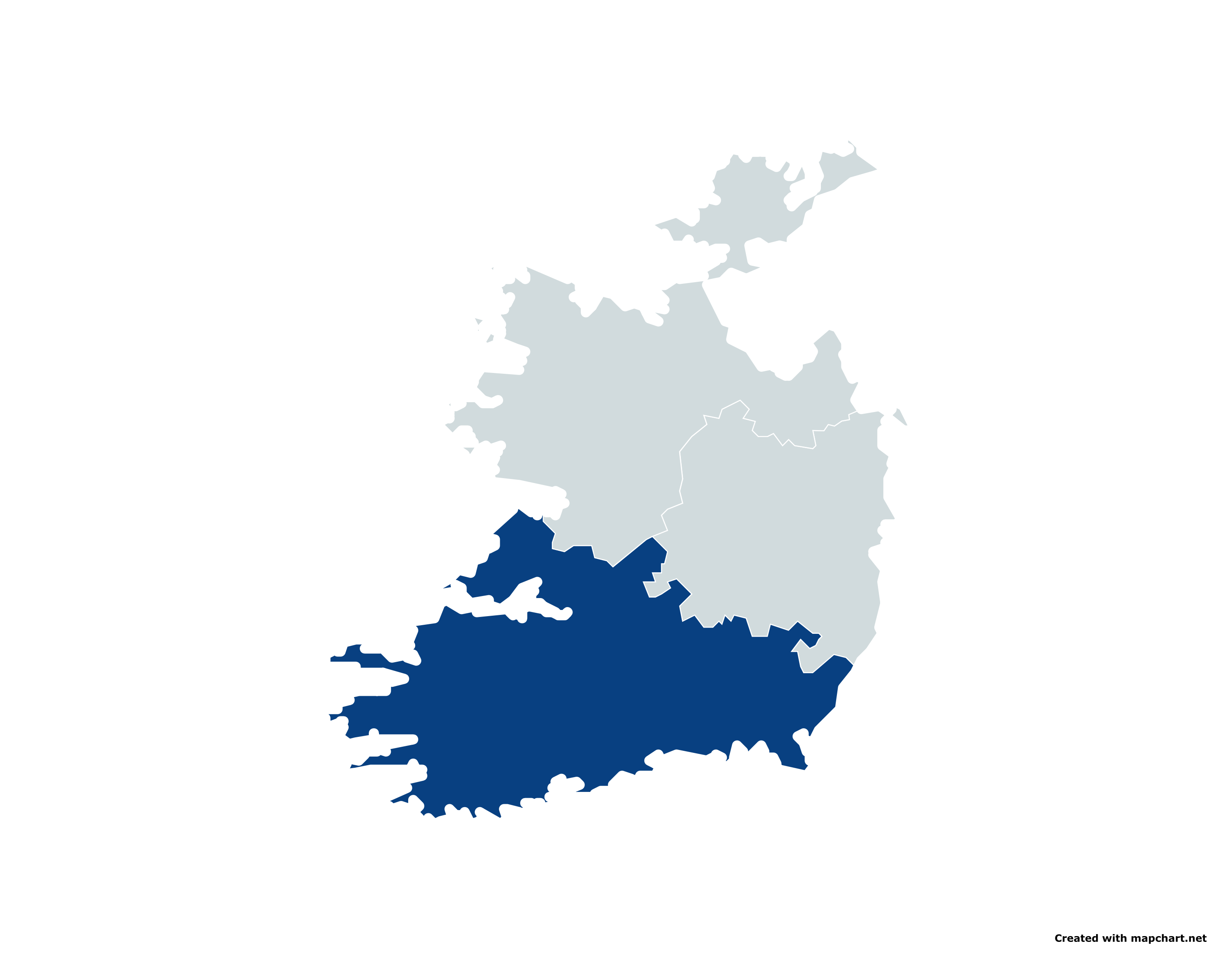
- Southern Ireland in blue
- Coordinates: 52.4343°N 8.2741°W
- Country: Ireland

Area
  - Total: 29,829 km^{2} (11,517 sq mi)

Population (2024)
  - Total: 1,772,411
  - Density: 59.419/km^{2} (153.89/sq mi)

GDP
  - Total: €182.323 billion (2024)
  - Per capita: €101,110 (2024)
- NUTS code: IE05
- HDI (2022): 0.940 very high
- Website: Official website
- Map of Southern Ireland region

Southern Region of Ireland is a subdivision of Ireland as defined by the Nomenclature of Territorial Units for Statistics (NUTS). It is one of the three classified NUTS-2 statistical regions of Ireland. The region incorporates the southern parts of the country, and incorporates ten counties across the Mid-West, South-East, and South-West regions. With a population of nearly 1.8 million, it is the second most populated of the three regions of Ireland. And with a high HDI, the region is classified as one of the more developed regions in the European Union.

== Classification ==
The country of Ireland is organized into eight regions for administrative purposes. The Nomenclature of Territorial Units for Statistics (NUTS) organizes the country into three broader level sub-divisions. These are classified as a NUTS-2 statistical regions of Ireland, and incorporate one or more of the eight regions within it. The regions form the NUTS-3 territorial units under them.

== Geography ==
Southern Ireland incorporates the southern parts of the country, encompassing an area of 29,829 km^{2} (11,517 sq mi). The region is located in Western Europe, roughly to the left of the England. The region does not share any international land borders, and borders the other two regions (Northern and Western and Eastern and Midland) of Ireland to the north. It has a long coastline along the Atlantic Ocean. The topography of the region consists of central lowland valleys interspersed with mountainous terrain encircled by sandstone mountain ranges along the coast.

=== Sub-regions ===
The Southern Ireland region incorporates ten counties across three regions–Mid-West, South-East, and South-West.

Regions	NUTS code	County	SRA members	Population (2022)
Mid-West	IE051	County Clare	2	127,938
Mid-West	IE051	Limerick City and County	3	209,536
Mid-West	IE051	County Tipperary	3	167,895
South-East	IE052	County Carlow	2	61,968
South-East	IE052	County Kilkenny	2	104,160
South-East	IE052	Waterford City and County	2	127,363
South-East	IE052	County Wexford	3	163,919
South-West	IE053	Cork City	2	224,004
South-West	IE053	County Cork	5	360,152
South-West	IE053	County Kerry	2	156,458

== Demographics ==
Southern Ireland had a population of nearly 1.8 million in 2024, and is the second most populated of the three regions of Ireland. The region has a high Human Development Index, and is classified as a more developed region under the eligibility classification for funding under the European Regional Development Fund and the European Social Fund Plus.

The Southern Regional Assembly is one of three Regional Assemblies in Ireland which were established in 2015 following an amendment to the Local Government Act 1991, replacing the eight Regional Authorities. It is composed of members nominated by the local authorities in the region from its constituent local bodies. It has 33 members, 27 of whom are appointed by the local authorities, and six Committee of the Regions representatives.
