= Tomás Ó hÍcí =

Irish scribe (1775–1856)

Tomás Ó hÍcí, aka Tomás Ó Iceadha and Thomas Hickey (1775–1856), was an Irish scribe.

Ó hÍcí was born in Baile an Ghraeigh, Killenaule (Cill Náile), in County Tipperary, the oldest child of Seán Ó hIcí and Máire Ní Bhraonáin. According to his own account "I led the life of a country peasant until I was forty two years of age, labouring hard at learning to read and write the language of my forefathers. I at last became so fond of it that I determined not to read anything but Irish, even at Mass; for I thought I could not pray fervently in English ..."

He moved to Waterford, where he was active in teaching and scribal work until his death. Some of his manuscripts are held at Mount Melleray.

In 1821, Father Síomón Breathnach wrote to James Hardiman,

"If you should want another to help write out the Irish Minstrelsy, I don’t know any man more capable of succeeding James Scurry (Séamus Ó Scoraidhe) than Thomas Hickey whose name you heard me mention so often and whose name poor Scurry mentioned in his essay. He is by far the best Irish scholar I ever met, except poor Scurry — he read and wrote more Irish than Scurry, though Scurry knew the language radically and grammatically better ... N.B. Thomas Hickey was the collector and writer of the Leabhar Dubh."

His obit in The Nation of 25 October 1856 stated

"Mr Hickey was Professor of Irish for upwards of twenty years in St John’s College, Waterford, during which time he was respected and esteemed by the professors and students of that college. Very many priests of the diocese of Waterford and Lismore studied the Irish language under his direction. Among the books he translated are the Roman Missal, the Glories of Mary and the greater portion of the Bible."

An earlier edition of the same paper (27 March 1852) said of him:

"He is one of the last of the great Irish scholars of whom the editor of Donleavy’s catechism [an tAthair John McEncroe in 1822 agus 1848] remarks that they were able by “stratagem” to keep themselves in existence. This is literally true of him for he is buried alive in a stable loft where he can say with holy Job 'soror mea vermibus'."

Ó hIcí was quoted on his situation

"Now, Sir, as to my present condition, it is my own choice . . .. Nor would I change my condition for a situation in the best university in England or anywhere else without the permission and approbation of Dr. O’Brien, from whom I never wish to be separated as long as he is pleased to keep me."
