= Local Government Reform Act 2014 =

Law amending the structures of local government in Ireland

Oireachtas
- Long title: An Act to make further and better provision in relation to local government and, in particular, to amalgamate Limerick County Council with Limerick City Council, Waterford County Council with Waterford City Council and North Tipperary County Council with South Tipperary County Council, to provide for the position of chief executive in relation to each local authority, to dissolve town councils, to make provision for municipal districts, to assign additional reserved functions to local authority members, to dissolve County Development Boards and City Development Boards and make provision for the establishment of Local Community Development Committees, for planning and oversight of Local and Community Development Programmes, to provide for an increased role for local authorities in economic development and enterprise support, to amend the Local Government Act 1991 and provide for regional assemblies, to enable (subject to certain preconditions) a plebiscite to be held in the administrative areas of the local authorities in the Dublin area in respect of a directly elected mayor for that area and for those and other purposes to amend the Local Government Acts 1925 to 2013, the Local Elections Acts 1974 to 2012 and other enactments relating to elections, the Housing Acts 1966 to 2013 and the Planning and Development Act 2000, to amend other Acts in connection with the foregoing matters, to amend section 20 of the Dublin Docklands Development Authority Act 1997 and to provide for related matters.
- Citation: No. 1 of 2014
- Signed: 27 January 2014
- Commenced: Various dates

Legislative history
- Bill citation: No. 98 of 2013
- Introduced by: Minister for the Environment, Community and Local Government (Phil Hogan)
- Introduced: 15 October 2013

Amends
- Local Government Act 2001

The Local Government Reform Act 2014 (No. 1) is an act of the Oireachtas which provided for a major restructuring of local government in Ireland with effect from the 2014 local elections. It merged some first-tier county and city councils, abolished all second-tier town and borough councils, and created a new second tier of municipal districts covering rural as well as urban areas. It also provided for a plebiscite on whether to create a directly elected executive Mayor of the Dublin Metropolitan Area (distinct from the existing ceremonial office of Lord Mayor of Dublin city) although this provision was not activated. The act was introduced as a bill on 15 October 2013 by Phil Hogan, the Minister for the Environment, Community and Local Government, and signed into law on 27 January 2014 by President Michael D. Higgins. Most of its provisions came into force on 1 June 2014.

== Background ==
The Local Government Act 2001 had replaced the Local Government (Ireland) Act 1898 as the primary legislation for local government in the state. It redesignated the "urban district councils" and "town commissioners" as "town councils" without substantive changes to their existing powers, which were relatively slight for urban districts and even more so for commissioners. Various plans for more fundamental changes to the local government system have been made both before and after the 2001 Act. After the 2011 general election, the new Fine Gael–Labour coalition's programme for government promised reform and rationalisation of local authorities, both to enhance democratic accountability and local power, and as part of a broader range of spending cuts in response to the state's ongoing financial crisis. In 2011 and 2012, local commissions recommended the mergers of three pairs of neighbouring first-tier local authorities: North and South Tipperary, Waterford City and County, and Limerick City and County. In 2012, the Department of the Environment, Community and Local Government published Putting People First — Action Programme for Effective Local Government, which outlined the changes planned for the prospective bill. The minister established a boundary commission to define local electoral areas for the 2014 election, including the Action Programme within its terms of reference.

Provision for directly elected mayors was included in the 2001 Act but repealed in 2003 without having been invoked. The idea of an executive mayor for Greater Dublin was given impetus by the establishment of a Mayor of London, and was promoted by the Green Party in the 2007–11 government. A bill to that effect was introduced in 2010, lapsing when the Dáil was dissolved for the 2011 election.

== Provisions of the act ==
The main provisions are summarised in the Act's long title:

An Act to make further and better provision in relation to local government and, in particular, to amalgamate Limerick County Council with Limerick City Council, Waterford County Council with Waterford City Council and North Tipperary County Council with South Tipperary County Council, to provide for the position of chief executive in relation to each local authority, to dissolve town councils, to make provision for municipal districts, to assign additional reserved functions to local authority members, to dissolve County Development Boards and City Development Boards and make provision for the establishment of Local Community Development Committees, for planning and oversight of Local and Community Development Programmes, to provide for an increased role for local authorities in economic development and enterprise support, to amend the Local Government Act 1991 and provide for regional assemblies, to enable (subject to certain preconditions) a plebiscite to be held in the administrative areas of the local authorities in the Dublin area in respect of a directly elected mayor for that area and for those and other purposes to amend the Local Government Acts 1925 to 2013, the Local Elections Acts 1974 to 2012 and other enactments relating to elections, the Housing Acts 1966 to 2013 and the Planning and Development Act 2000, to amend other Acts in connection with the foregoing matters, to amend section 20 of the Dublin Docklands Development Authority Act 1997 and to provide for related matters.

=== Details ===
The merged North Tipperary and South Tipperary was a county called Tipperary, restoring the county's administrative unity for the first time since 1838. The merged Limerick and Waterford areas were designated a "city and county", otherwise equivalent to a county.

Except in the Dublin Region, all counties (including the two "cities and counties") were subdivided into two or more second-tier units called "municipal districts". The districts which include Limerick and Waterford cities are "metropolitan districts" and those including an existing borough are "borough districts"; both names conferring the right for the chairperson of the district council to be called "mayor". Each district comprises one (or, occasionally, more than one) local electoral area; the district councillors also serve as the area's county councillors.

The position of county/city manager" was replaced by that of "Chief Executive". Existing managers were the initial chief executives, with local authorities gaining the power to veto subsequent appointments and to remove a chief executive for "stated misbehaviour".

Part 11 of the act provided for a process leading to a directly elected mayor for the Dublin Metropolitan Area. This required approval from the councils of the four local authorities in the area, namely the city of Dublin and the counties of South Dublin, Fingal, and Dún Laoghaire–Rathdown. Three supported it, but Fingal County Council voted 16–6 to reject it on 31 March 2014, terminating the process.

=== Local authority changes ===
County	Local Authority	Members	Change
Carlow	Carlow County Council	18	−3
Cavan	Cavan County Council	18	–7
Clare	Clare County Council	28	–4
Cork	Cork County Council	55	+7
Donegal	Donegal County Council	37	+8
Dún Laoghaire–Rathdown	Dún Laoghaire–Rathdown County Council	40	+12
Fingal	Fingal County Council	40	+16
Galway	Galway County Council	39	+9
Kerry	Kerry County Council	33	+6
Kildare	Kildare County Council	40	+15
Kilkenny	Kilkenny County Council	24	–2
Laois	Laois County Council	19	–6
Leitrim	Leitrim County Council	18	–4
Longford	Longford County Council	18	–3
Louth	Louth County Council	29	+3
Mayo	Mayo County Council	30	–1
Meath	Meath County Council	40	+11
Monaghan	Monaghan County Council	18	–2
Offaly	Offaly County Council	19	–2
Roscommon	Roscommon County Council	18	–8
Sligo	Sligo County Council	18	–7
South Dublin	South Dublin County Council	40	+14
Tipperary	Tipperary County Council	40	–7 (Note: Compared to the total members of North Tipperary and South Tipperary county councils.)
Westmeath	Westmeath County Council	20	–3
Wexford	Wexford County Council	34	+13
Wicklow	Wicklow County Council	32	+8
City	Local Authority	Members	Change
Cork	Cork City Council	31	—
Dublin	Dublin City Council	63	+11
Galway	Galway City Council	18	+3
City and County	Local Authority	Members	Change
Limerick city and County Limerick	Limerick City and County Council	40	–5 (Note: Compared to the total members of Limerick City and Limerick County councils.)
Waterford city and County Waterford	Waterford City and County Council	32	–6 (Note: Compared to the total members of Waterford City and Waterford County councils.)

== Debate ==
The Association of Municipal Authorities of Ireland (AMAI), which represented the town and borough councils abolished under the act, objected to the bill. It later published guidelines for the transition to the new structure. In March 2014, after the AMAI decided not to challenge the Act in court, another group called Former Local Authority Members Éire (FLAME) was founded by members of abolished councils. After the bill became law the AMAI merged with the Association of County & City Councils to form the Association of Irish Local Government.

The bill was introduced as the Local Government Bill 2013; the word "Reform" was inserted into its title at committee stage by the select subcommittee on the Environment, Community and Local Government.

On 28 April 2014, Mattie McGrath TD applied to the High Court for an injunction to stop the local elections on 23 May 2014, arguing the 2014 Act was null as it was passed without a vote, and that it violated Article 28A of the Constitution and the European Charter of Local Self-Government.

== Aftermath ==
In March 2015, then Labour Party ministers Brendan Howlin and Alan Kelly expressed dissatisfaction with the abolition of town councils. Howlin regretted having acquiesced to Fine Gael minister Phil Hogan, who championed the proposal. The Irish Independent reported in November 2015 that the Fianna Fáil manifesto for the 2016 election would promise to restore town councils.

In 2015, an advisory group and forum began reviewing local government; based on their work up to May 2016, Simon Coveney the then Minister for the Environment, Community and Local Government said, "the revised structures are generally operating well but will need more time to bed down fully". The programme of the Fine Gael–led government formed after the 2016 election considered "establishing town and borough councils subject to a local plebiscite and local funding". In June 2017, Fianna Fáil introduced a private member's bill to establish a Town Councils Commission "to carry out a review and make recommendations relating to the establishment and boundaries of a town council system". It was opposed by the government on the grounds that it would pre-empt its own report, published in July 2017, on "potential measures to boost local government leadership and accountability".
