= Twentieth Amendment of the Constitution of Ireland =

Amendment recognising local government

- 11 June 1999
- To provide constitutional recognition of local government

Results
Choice	Votes	%
Yes	1,024,850	77.83%
No	291,965	22.17%
Valid votes	1,316,815	92.35%
Invalid or blank votes	109,066	7.65%
Total votes	1,425,881	100.00%
Registered voters/turnout	2,791,415	51.08%

The Twentieth Amendment of the Constitution Act 2001 is an amendment to the Constitution of Ireland which provided constitutional recognition of local government and required that local government elections occur at least once in every five years. It was approved by referendum on 11 June 1999 and signed into law on 23 June of the same year. The referendum was held the same day as the local and European Parliament elections.

== Background ==
The structure of local government in Ireland dates back to the Local Government (Ireland) Act 1898, subject to amendments since then. There was no reference to local government in the Constitution as adopted in 1937. Local elections were held at irregular intervals: the local elections held previous to the adoption of the Amendment were in 1991, 1985 and 1979. Constitutional recognition of local government was proposed by the All-Party Committee on the Constitution, including a requirement to hold regular election.

== Changes to the text ==
Insertion of a new Article:

LOCAL GOVERNMENT

Article 28A

1. The State recognises the role of local government in providing a forum for the democratic representation of local communities, in exercising and performing at local level powers and functions conferred by law and in promoting by its initiatives the interests of such communities.
2. There shall be such directly elected local authorities as may be determined by law and their powers and functions shall, subject to the provisions of this Constitution, be so determined and shall be exercised and performed in accordance with law.
3. Elections for members of such local authorities shall be held in accordance with law not later than the end of the fifth year after the year in which they were last held.
4. Every citizen who has the right to vote at an election for members of Dáil Éireann and such other persons as may be determined by law shall have the right to vote at an election for members of such of the local authorities referred to in section 2 of this Article as shall be determined by law.
5. Casual vacancies in the membership of local authorities referred to in section 2 of this Article shall be filled in accordance with law.

== Oireachtas debate ==
The Amendment was sponsored by the Minister for the Environment and Local Government and was proposed in the Dáil on 11 May 1999 by Minister of State Dan Wallace on behalf of the Fianna Fáil–Progressive Democrats coalition government led by Taoiseach Bertie Ahern. It was passed final stages in the Dáil on 12 May where it was opposed by opposition parties Fine Gael, the Labour Party, the Green Party, the Socialist Party and Independent Tony Gregory. Their opposition was to elements of the drafting rather than the principle of constitutional recognition of local government. It passed final stages in the Seanad on the same day, and proceeded to a referendum on 11 June 1999.

== Campaign ==
A Referendum Commission was established by Minister for the Environment and Local Government Noel Dempsey. At the time, its role included setting out the arguments for and against the proposal.

== Result ==
Twentieth Amendment of the Constitution of Ireland referendum
Choice	Votes	%
For	1,024,850	77.83
Against	291,965	22.17
Total	1,316,815	100.00
Valid votes	1,316,815	92.35
Invalid/blank votes	109,066	7.65
Total votes	1,425,881	100.00
Registered voters/turnout	2,791,415	51.08

Results by constituency
Constituency	Electorate	Turnout (%)	Votes		Proportion of votes	
Constituency	Electorate	Turnout (%)	Yes	No	Yes	No
County Carlow	34,074	51.5%	12,403	3,900	76.1%	23.9%
County Cavan	43,134	64.2%	20,028	5,422	78.7%	21.3%
County Clare	75,542	60.1%	32,618	8,726	78.9%	21.1%
Cork City	91,255	46.9%	31,375	8,858	78.0%	22.0%
County Cork (Northern Division)	58,242	62.9%	26,053	6,699	79.6%	20.4%
County Cork (Southern Division)	136,188	52.5%	51,761	14,172	78.6%	21.4%
County Cork (Western Division)	37,426	65.6%	18,143	4,185	81.3%	18.7%
County Donegal	105,236	62.0%	46,669	13,774	77.3%	22.7%
Dublin City	351,188	35.4%	87,558	30,385	74.3%	25.7%
Dún Laoghaire–Rathdown	146,036	39.1%	42,606	11,870	78.3%	21.7%
Fingal	121,929	39.1%	34,180	11,076	75.6%	24.4%
Galway City	38,846	44.5%	12,318	3,300	78.9%	21.1%
County Galway	103,728	58.4%	43,512	10,590	80.5%	19.5%
County Kerry	100,272	63.3%	44,189	12,493	78.0%	22.0%
County Kildare	102,867	44.8%	33,939	9,408	78.3%	21.7%
County Kilkenny	57,167	56.3%	23,411	6,235	79.0%	21.0%
County Laois	40,820	62.4%	17,643	5,690	75.7%	24.3%
County Leitrim	21,232	75.4%	11,875	2,972	80.0%	20.0%
Limerick City	37,816	48.0%	12,849	4,031	76.2%	23.8%
County Limerick	86,420	56.0%	34,364	9,111	79.1%	20.9%
County Longford	24,385	71.0%	12,213	3,453	78.0%	22.0%
County Louth	73,906	48.4%	25,553	8,039	76.1%	23.9%
County Mayo	87,636	64.5%	42,538	8,901	82.7%	17.3%
County Meath	94,558	46.7%	32,210	8,814	78.6%	21.4%
County Monaghan	41,172	66.0%	18,879	5,711	76.8%	23.2%
County Offaly	46,117	57.2%	19,133	5,272	78.4%	21.6%
County Roscommon	40,814	69.7%	20,971	5,196	80.2%	19.8%
County Sligo	43,546	69.3%	22,053	5,836	79.1%	20.9%
South Dublin	160,517	34.0%	38,824	13,226	74.6%	25.4%
Tipperary North	46,434	67.4%	22,708	5,910	79.4%	20.6%
Tipperary South	58,106	64.0%	26,932	7,160	79.0%	21.0%
Waterford City	29,451	45.0%	9,599	2,756	77.7%	22.3%
County Waterford	41,934	61.9%	17,475	4,896	78.2%	21.8%
County Westmeath	49,061	52.8%	18,666	5,279	78.0%	22.0%
County Wexford	85,172	51.1%	30,772	9,316	76.8%	23.2%
County Wicklow	79,188	51.6%	28,830	9,303	75.7%	24.3%
Total	2,791,415	51.1%	1,024,850	291,965	77.8%	22.2%

Note: For this referendum, the constituencies used were each county and city, which were deemed to be constituencies for the purpose of the poll. Usually in Irish referendums the general election constituencies are used.
