= North Tipperary =

Former Irish county (1899–2014)

North Tipperary Tiobraid Árann Thuaidh Tipperary (North Riding)
- Former County; 1899–2014
- Country: Ireland
- Province: Munster
- Created: 1 April 1899
- Abolished: 1 June 2014
- County town: Nenagh

Government
  - Type: North Tipperary County Council

Area
  - Total: 2,046 km^{2} (790 sq mi)

Population (2011)
  - Total: 70,322
- Car plates: TN (1987–2013)

North Tipperary (Irish: Tiobraid Árann Thuaidh) was a county in Ireland in the province of Munster. It was named after the town of Tipperary (which was in South Tipperary) and consisted of 48% of the land area of the traditional county of Tipperary. North Tipperary County Council was the local authority for the county. In 2011, the population of the county was 70,322.

It was abolished on 1 June 2014, amalgamated with South Tipperary to form County Tipperary, administered by a new Tipperary County Council.

== Geography and subdivisions ==
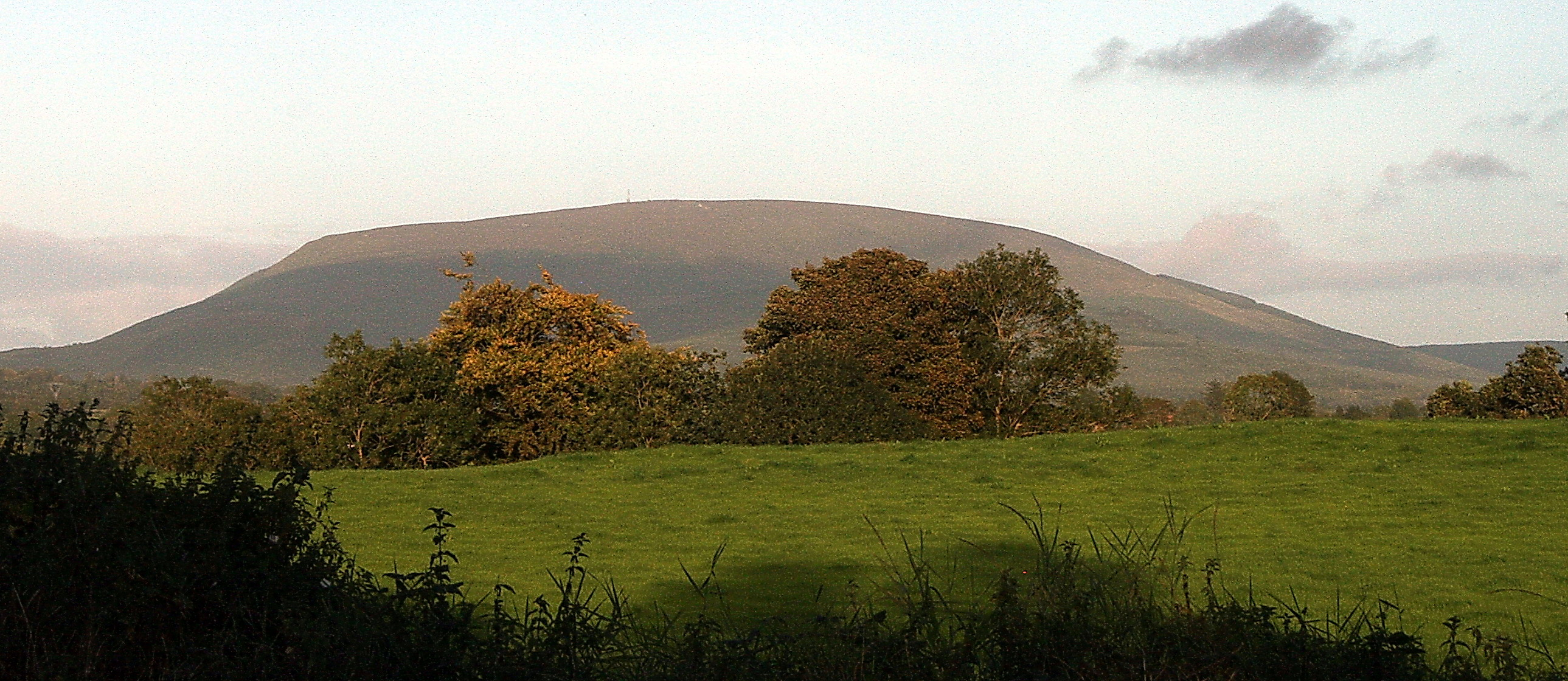
Keeper Hill

The county was part of the central plain of Ireland, but the diversified terrain contained several mountain ranges: the Arra Hills, Silvermine Mountains and the Devil's Bit. The county was landlocked. The southern part of the former county is drained by the River Suir; the northern part is drained by tributaries of the River Shannon which widens into Lough Derg. The centre of the county included much of the Golden Vale, a rich pastoral stretch of land in the Suir basin which extends into counties Limerick and Cork.

Its population centres included Nenagh (the county town), Borrisoleigh, Templemore, Thurles, and Roscrea.

=== Baronies ===
There were six historic baronies in North Tipperary: Eliogarty, Ikerrin, Ormond Upper, Ormond Lower, Owney and Arra and Kilnamanagh Upper.

=== Civil parishes and townlands ===
Civil parishes in Ireland were delineated after the Down Survey as an intermediate subdivision, with multiple townlands per parish and multiple parishes per barony. The civil parishes had some use in local taxation and were included on the nineteenth century maps of the Ordnance Survey of Ireland. For poor law purposes district electoral divisions replaced the civil parishes in the mid-nineteenth century. There were 86 civil parishes in the county.

== Local government ==
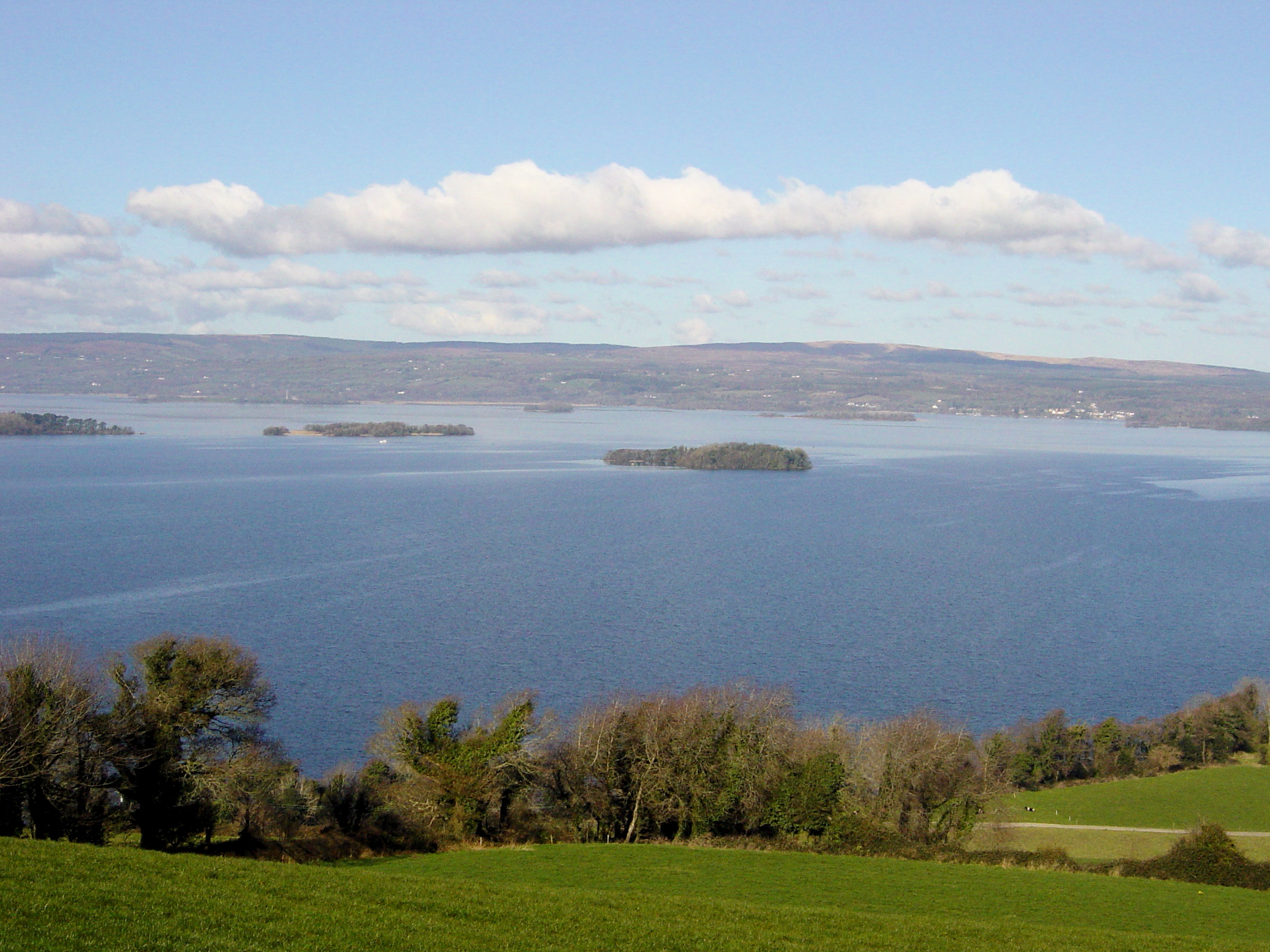
Lough Derg

The North Riding had existed as a judicial county following the establishment of assize courts in 1838. The administrative county of Tipperary, North Riding was created under the Local Government (Ireland) Act 1898 as the area of the existing judicial county of the North Riding of the county of Tipperary, except for the district electoral divisions of Cappagh, Curraheen and Glengar (which were transferred to the South Riding). It took effect on 1 April 1899.

In 2002, the county's name was changed under the Local Government Act 2001 to North Tipperary, and the council's name to North Tipperary County Council. The council oversaw the county as a local government area. The council comprised 21 representatives, directly elected through the system of proportional representation by means of a single transferable vote (PR-STV).

Under the Regional Authorities established in 1994, North Tipperary was part of the Mid-West Region, a NUTS III region of the European Union, whereas South Tipperary was part of the South-East Region. At a NUTS II level, both counties were in the Southern and Eastern region. A revision to the NUTS regions, after the amalgamation of the counties, brought both under the Mid-West Region.

The council also claimed the title of The Premier County, a title which was usually taken to refer to the undivided territory of both north and south Tipperary. Following the division of the original county, North Tipperary was not granted its own coat of arms.
