= South-West Region, Ireland =

NUTS 3 region in Ireland

The South-West region of Ireland with each constituent local government area highlighted.

The South-West is a strategic planning area within the Southern Region in Ireland. It is a NUTS Level III statistical region of Ireland (coded IE053). It includes the city of Cork and the counties of Cork and Kerry. The South-West region spans 12,120 km^{2} (4,680 sq mi), roughly 16% of the total area of the state and according to the 2022 census has a population of 736,489.

From 1994 to 2014, the region was governed by the South-West Regional Authority. That body was abolished in 2014 and from 2015, it was succeeded by the Southern Regional Assembly.

The South-West Region benefits from a mild climate and has a very scenic environment, which includes features such as MacGillycuddy's Reeks (the highest mountain range in Ireland), the Dingle Peninsula, Mizen Head and the Iveragh Peninsula, along with numerous small islands.

== South-West Regional Authority ==
The South-West Region was administered by the South-West Regional Authority, which consisted of 24 elected representatives, including the region's representative on the EU Committee of the Regions. These representatives met once a month and were nominated from the three administrative councils of the region:

- Cork City Council (7)
- Cork County Council (9)
- Kerry County Council (8)

The Regional Authorities were dissolved in 2014 and were replaced by Regional Assemblies.

== Demographics ==
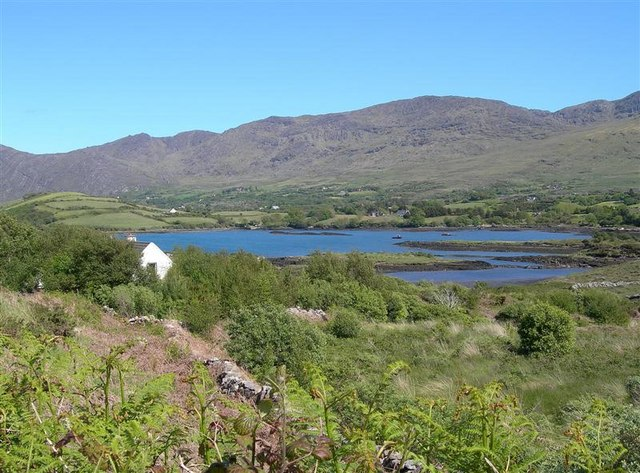
Ardgroom, County Cork. Small rural villages typify the southwest.

The South-West region has experienced a steady increase in its population with migration to the region due to its strong educational infrastructure, scenery, mild climate, as well as its quality of life and work.

According to the 2016 census, the South-West region had a population of 689,750, which constitutes 14.5% of the national population. Its population density was 52.5 persons per km^{2}. 78.6% of the south-west's population (542,196 people), reside in County Cork. The remaining 21.4% (147,554 people) live in County Kerry.

The southwest is the home of Munster Irish and contains a number of nationally significant Gaeltacht areas, such as Dingle, Cape Clear Island and Muskerry. 14% of Ireland's Gaeltacht population lives in Cork and Kerry. According to the 2016 Census, 43% of Kerry and 45% of Cork are able to speak Irish.

The population of Cork City, including its suburbs, was 208,669.

== Economy ==
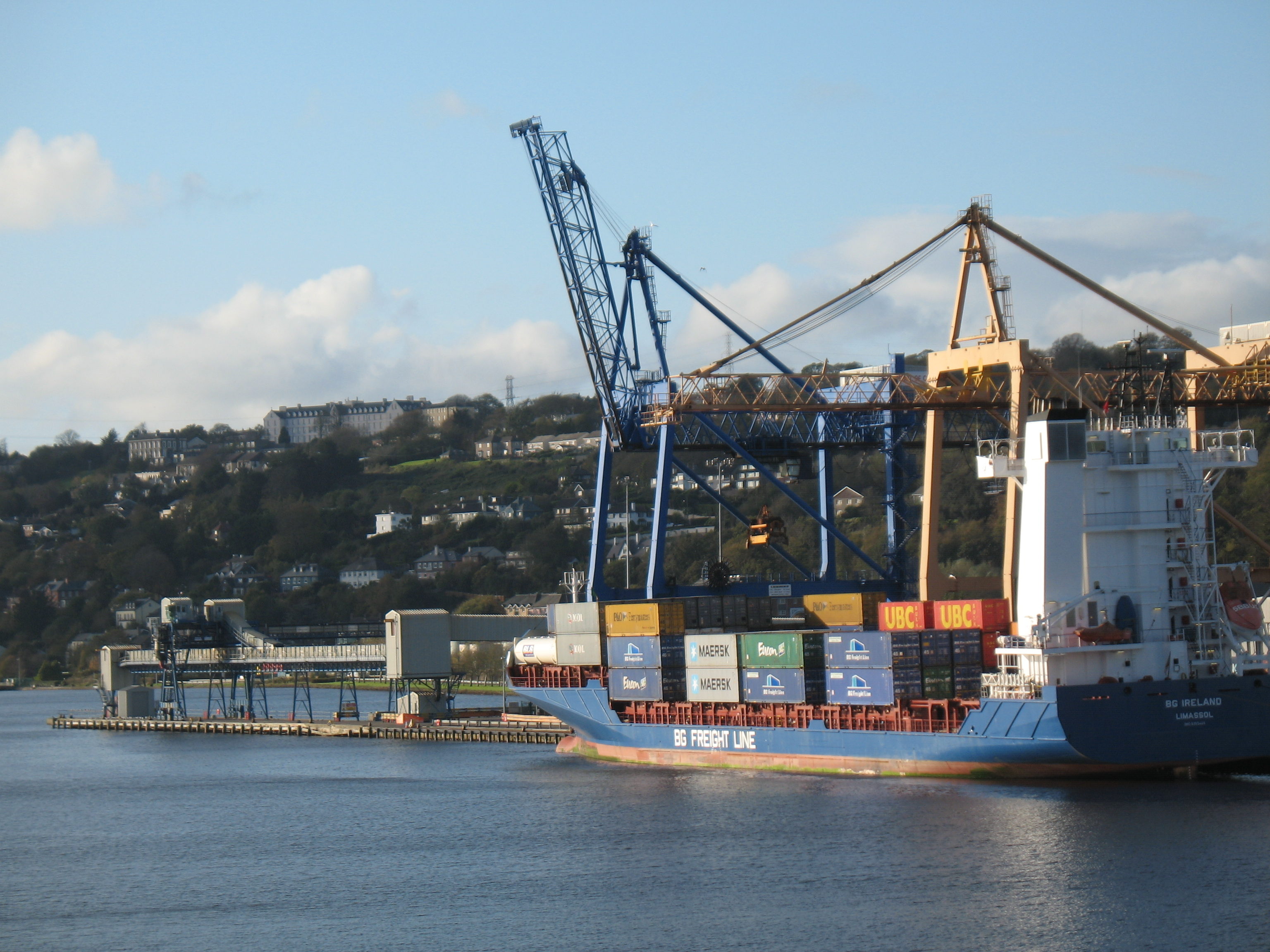
Cork Harbour, one of the world's largest natural harbours, serves as an economic gateway to the southwest.

The region's economy consists of a range of multi-national companies that specialise in areas such as electronics and pharmaceuticals. The food industry also forms an important sector in the regional economy. Tourism is also a major industry in the region.

Eurostat figures for 2012 gave the region a GDP of €32.4 bn and a GDP per capita of €48,500 (second highest on the island of Ireland, second only to Dublin €57,200). According to CSO figures for 2014, the region then had a GDP of €33.8 bn and a GDP per capita of €50,544. By 2020, this had risen to a contribution of €103.2 billion towards Irish GDP.

The workforce of the region in 2003 was 255,800, which equated to a 95.58% employment rate with services (59.9%), industrial employment (31.2%), and agriculture (8.9%) forming the key industries. The 2016 unemployment rate for the South-West region, at 5.7%, is the lowest of any other Irish NUTS region.

== Transport ==
The South-West region contains two airports, Cork International Airport and Kerry International Airport, both of which provide a wide range of flights to locations across Europe. The region also has ferry services operating between Cork, the United Kingdom and France.

== Geography ==
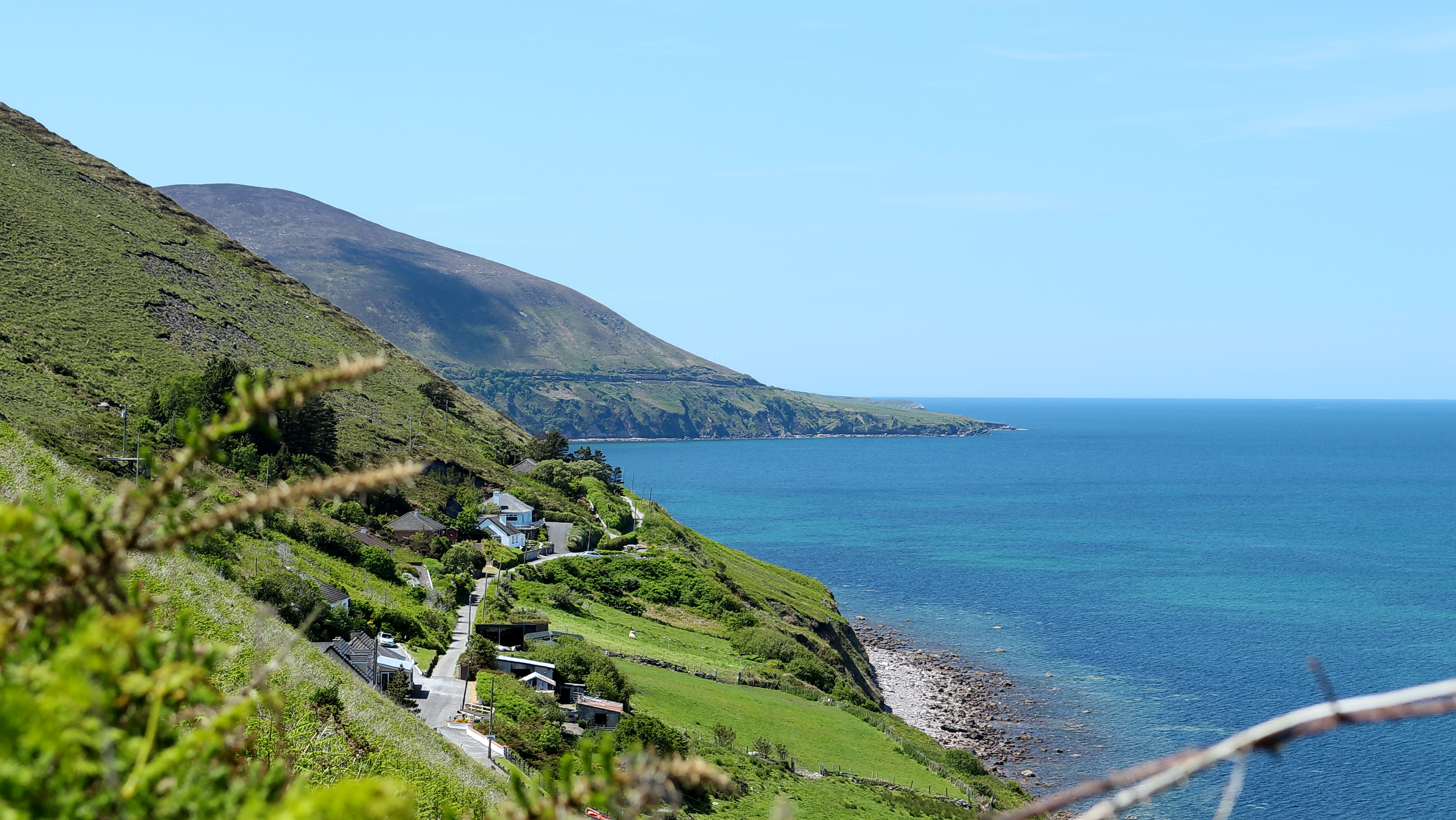
The Dingle Peninsula, Ireland's most westerly point.

Ireland's southernmost and westernmost points are located in the Southwest. Tearaght Island is the westernmost point located 12.5 km west of the Dingle Peninsula in Kerry. The southernmost point is Fastnet Rock, which lies 11.3 km south of mainland County Cork. Including only mainland Ireland, Brow Head, County Cork is the southernmost point and Dunmore Head, County Kerry is the westernmost point. Ireland's twelve highest mountains are located in County Kerry. Killarney National Park in Kerry has Ireland's only native herd of Red Deer and the most extensive covering of native forest remaining in Ireland. The southwest has a total of 132,274 hectares (326,860 acres) of forest and woodland area, larger than six different Irish counties. The area of the Southwest is 12,120 km^{2} (4,680 sq mi), roughly 16% of Ireland's land area which is large enough to fit the 10 smallest counties inside it and almost as large as Northern Ireland. The combined coastline of Cork and Kerry is 1,778 km (1,105 mi), including islands.

== Major settlements ==
A list of the ten largest settlements in the southwest County capitals are included and are shown in bold.

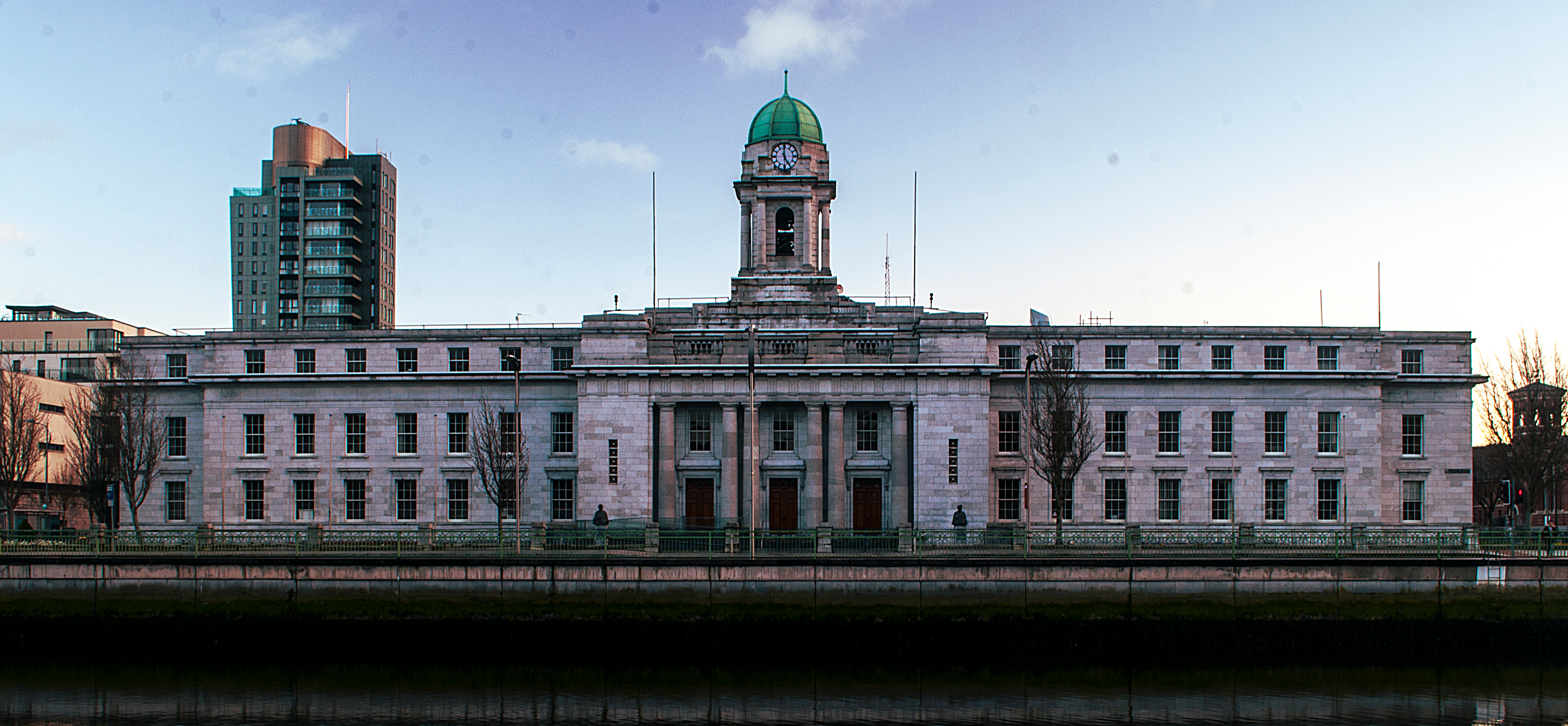
Cork City, County Cork

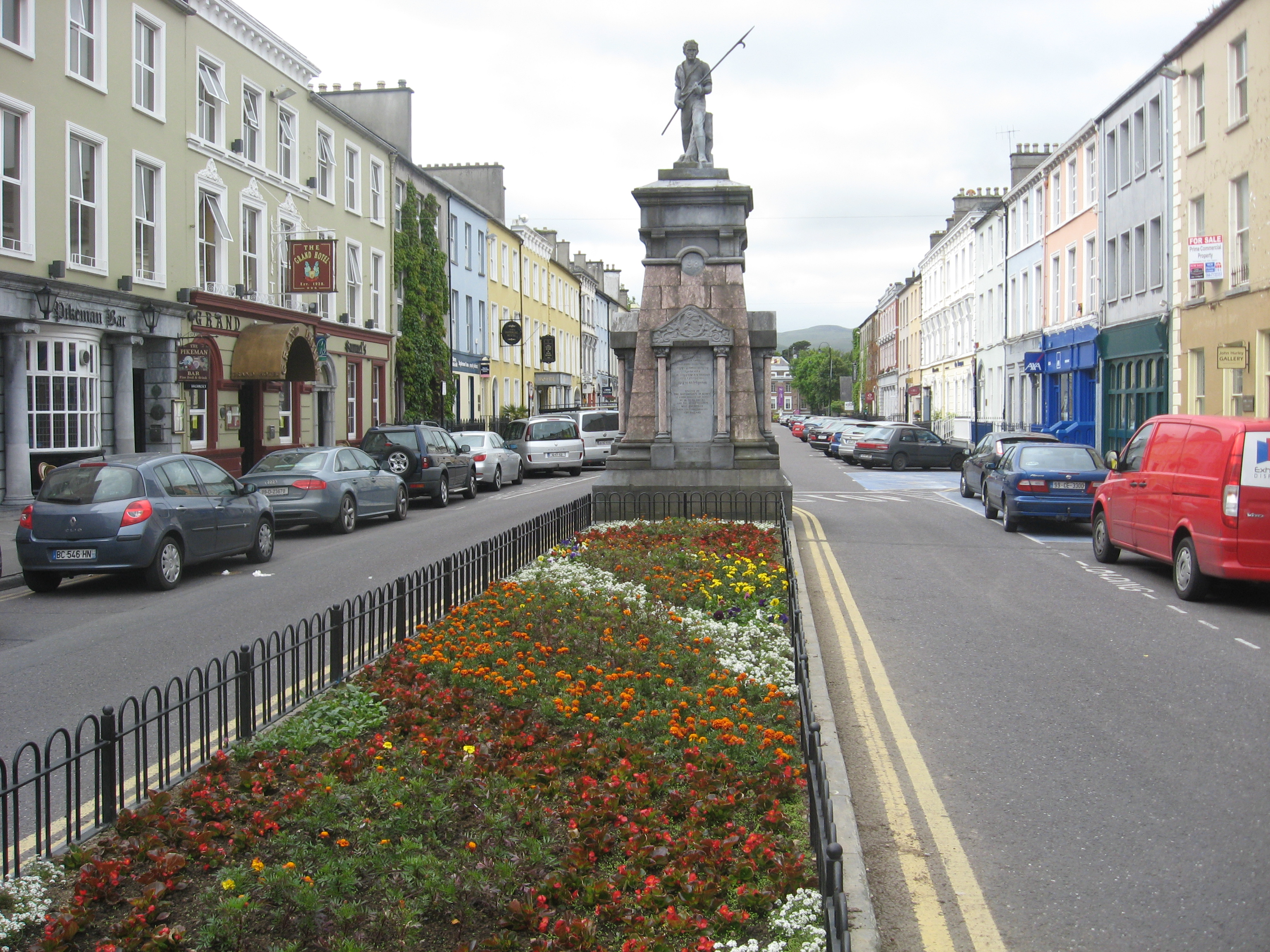
Tralee, County Kerry

Towns
Rank	Town	County	Population (2016 census)
1	**Cork**	Cork	208,669
2	**Tralee**	Kerry	23,691
3	Ballincollig	Cork	18,621
4	Carrigaline	Cork	15,770
5	Killarney	Kerry	14,504
6	Cobh	Cork	12,800
7	Midleton	Cork	12,496
8	Mallow	Cork	12,459
9	Youghal	Cork	7,963
10	Bandon	Cork	6,957

== See also ==
- Munster Technological University
