= Golden Vale =

Region in Munster, Ireland

Coordinates: 52.4°N 8.4°W

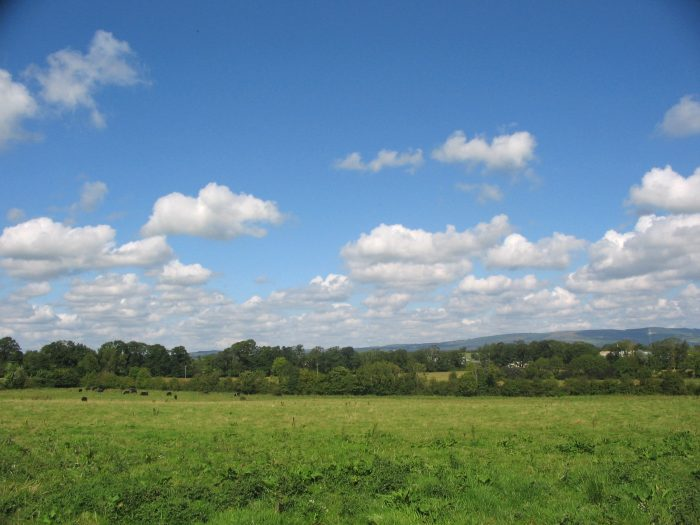
Typical east Limerick landscape of rich, green fields

The Golden Vale (Irish: Machaire méith na Mumhan) is the historic name given to an area of rolling pastureland in the province of Munster in southwestern Ireland. The area covers parts of three counties: Cork, Limerick and Tipperary. Considered the best land in Ireland for dairy farming, the region has been described as the "heart of the Munster dairying country".

== Geography ==
The Golden Vale is bordered in the east by the Galtee Mountains, with the Glen of Aherlow as a picturesque abutting valley. The Munster Blackwater valley is the Vale's southern part. Towns in the Golden Vale include Charleville, Mitchelstown, Kilmallock and Tipperary.

== Naming ==
Historically it has been called the Golden Vein. An early instance is an 1837 book by Jonathan Binns, a British government official, where he refers to the area as '"the golden vale" (more correctly the "golden vein")' and states "The land is of excellent quality, being part of the golden vein of Ireland—a district reaching from Tipperary towards Limerick. The extent of the golden vein is about fourteen miles long, by six or seven wide." (i.e. 23 × 10 km; an area of 58,000 acres or 236 km^{2}) Some subsequent writers similarly prefer "vein".

In 1739, Walter Harris suggested the "Golden" name was a corruption of Gowlin, former name of a village now called Golden, from Irish: An Gabhailín "little fork [in the River Suir]".
