= South Tipperary =

Former Irish county (1899–2014)

South Tipperary Tiobraid Árann Theas Tipperary (South Riding)
- Former County; 1899–2014
- Coat of arms
- Motto: Latin: Vallis Aurea Siurensis "The Golden Vale of the Suir"
- Country: Ireland
- Province: Munster
- Created: 1 April 1899
- Abolished: 1 June 2014
- County town: Clonmel

Government
  - Type: South Tipperary County Council

Area
  - Total: 2,257 km^{2} (871 sq mi)

Population (2011)
  - Total: 88,433
- Car plates: TS (1987–2013)

South Tipperary (Irish: Tiobraid Árann Theas) was a county in Ireland in the province of Munster. It was named after the town of Tipperary and consisted of 52% of the land area of the traditional county of Tipperary. South Tipperary County Council was the local authority for the county. The population of the county was 88,433 according to the 2011 census. It was abolished on 1 June 2014, and amalgamated with North Tipperary to form County Tipperary under a new Tipperary County Council.

== Geography and subdivisions ==
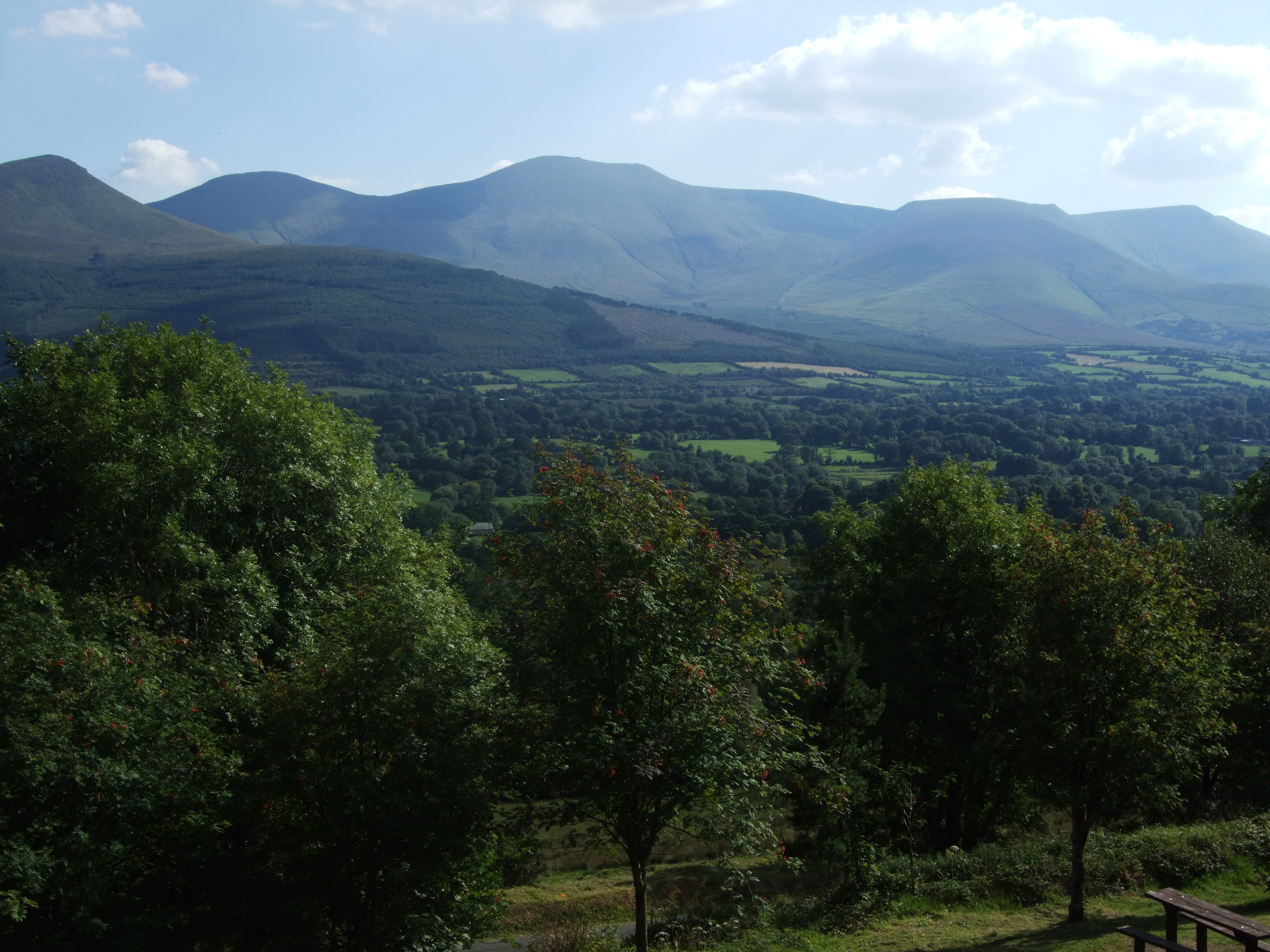
The Galtee Mountains seen from the Glen of Aherlow.

The county was part of the central plain of Ireland, but the diversified terrain contained several mountain ranges, notably the Knockmealdowns and the Galtees. The county was landlocked and drained by the River Suir. The centre of the county included much of the Golden Vale, a rich pastoral stretch of land in the Suir basin which extends into counties Limerick and Cork.

The county town was Clonmel; other important urban centres included Carrick-on-Suir, Cashel, Cahir and Tipperary. The county's motto was Vallis Aurea Siurensis (Latin for 'The Golden Vale of the Suir').

=== Baronies ===
There were six historic baronies in South Tipperary: Clanwilliam, Iffa and Offa East, Iffa and Offa West, Kilnamanagh Lower, Middle Third and Slievardagh.

=== Civil parishes and townlands ===
Civil parishes in Ireland were delineated after the Down Survey as an intermediate subdivision, with multiple townlands per parish and multiple parishes per barony. The civil parishes had some use in local taxation and were included on the nineteenth century maps of the Ordnance Survey of Ireland. For poor law purposes, district electoral divisions replaced civil parishes in the mid-nineteenth century. There were 123 civil parishes in the county.

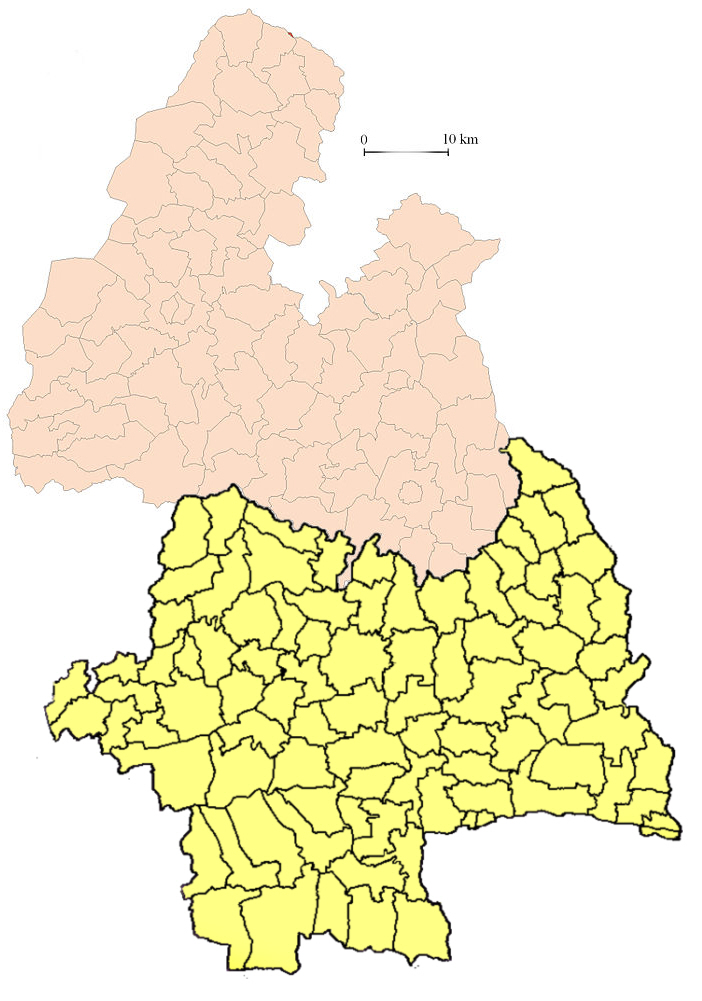
South Tipperary (yellow) divided into its electoral divisions.

== Local government ==
The South Riding of Tipperary had been a judicial county following the establishment of assize courts in 1838.

The administrative county of Tipperary, South Riding was created under the Local Government (Ireland) Act 1898 as the area of the existing judicial county of the South Riding of the county of Tipperary, with the addition of the district electoral divisions previously in the North Riding of Cappagh, Curraheen and Glengar, and the portions of the town of Carrick-on-Suir and the borough of Clonmel previously in County Waterford. It took effect on 1 April 1899.

In 2002, under the Local Government Act 2001, the county's name was changed to South Tipperary, and the council's name to South Tipperary County Council. The council oversaw the county as a local government area. The council was composed of 26 representatives, directly elected through the system of proportional representation by means of a single transferable vote (PR-STV).

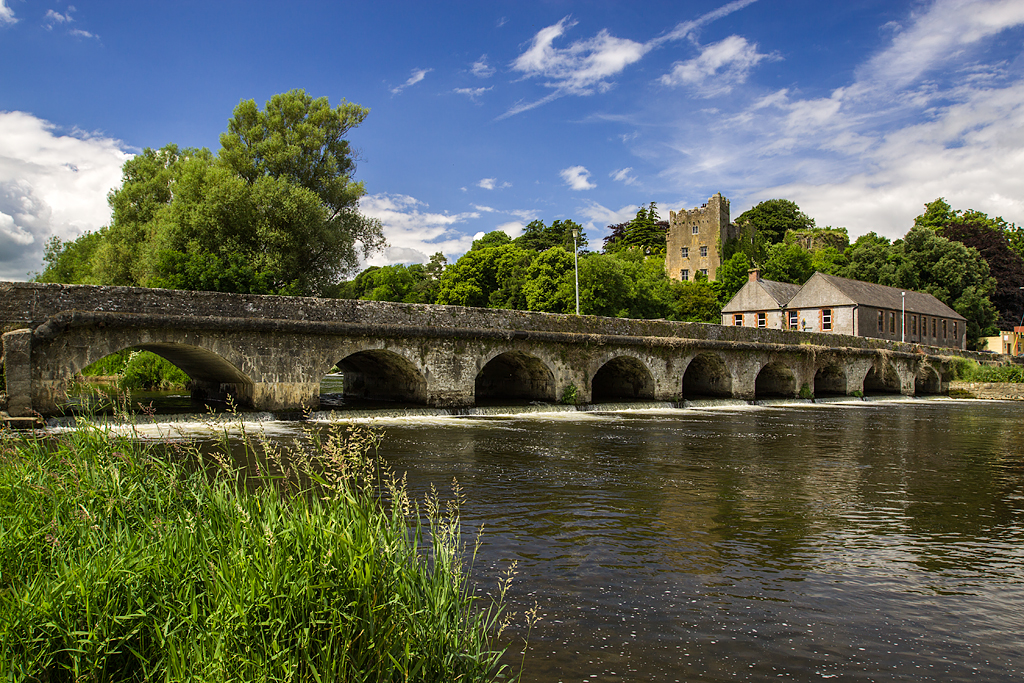
Ardfinnan Castle, Ardfinnan.

South Tipperary was part of the South-East Region, a NUTS III region of the European Union, whereas North Tipperary was part of the Mid-West Region. At a NUTS II level, both counties were in the Southern and Eastern region. A revision to the NUTS regions, after the amalgamation of the counties, brought both under the Mid-West Region.

== Irish language ==
There were native speakers of Irish in South Tipperary until the middle of the 20th century. Recordings of their dialect, made before the last native speakers died, have been made available through a project of the Royal Irish Academy Library.
