= County Tipperary =

County in Ireland

Coordinates: 52°40′N 7°50′W

County Tipperary Contae Thiobraid Árann
- County
- Coat of arms
- Nickname: The Premier County
- Interactive map of County Tipperary
- Country: Ireland
- Province: Munster
- Region: Southern
- Shired: 1328
- Divided: 1838
- Reunified: 2014
- County towns: Nenagh/Clonmel

Government
  - Local authority: Tipperary County Council
  - Dáil constituency: Tipperary
  - EP constituency: South

Area
  - Total: 4,305 km^{2} (1,662 sq mi)
  - Rank: 6th
- Highest elevation (Galtymore): 918 m (3,012 ft)

Population (2022)
  - Total: 167,895
  - Rank: 12th
  - Density: 39.00/km^{2} (101.0/sq mi)
- Time zone: UTC±0 (WET)
  - Summer (DST): UTC+1 (IST)
- Eircode routing keys: E21, E25, E32, E34, E41, E45, E53, E91 (primarily)
- Telephone area codes: 051, 0504, 0505, 052, 061, 062, 067 (primarily)
- ISO 3166 code: IE-TA
- Vehicle index mark code: T
- Website: Official website

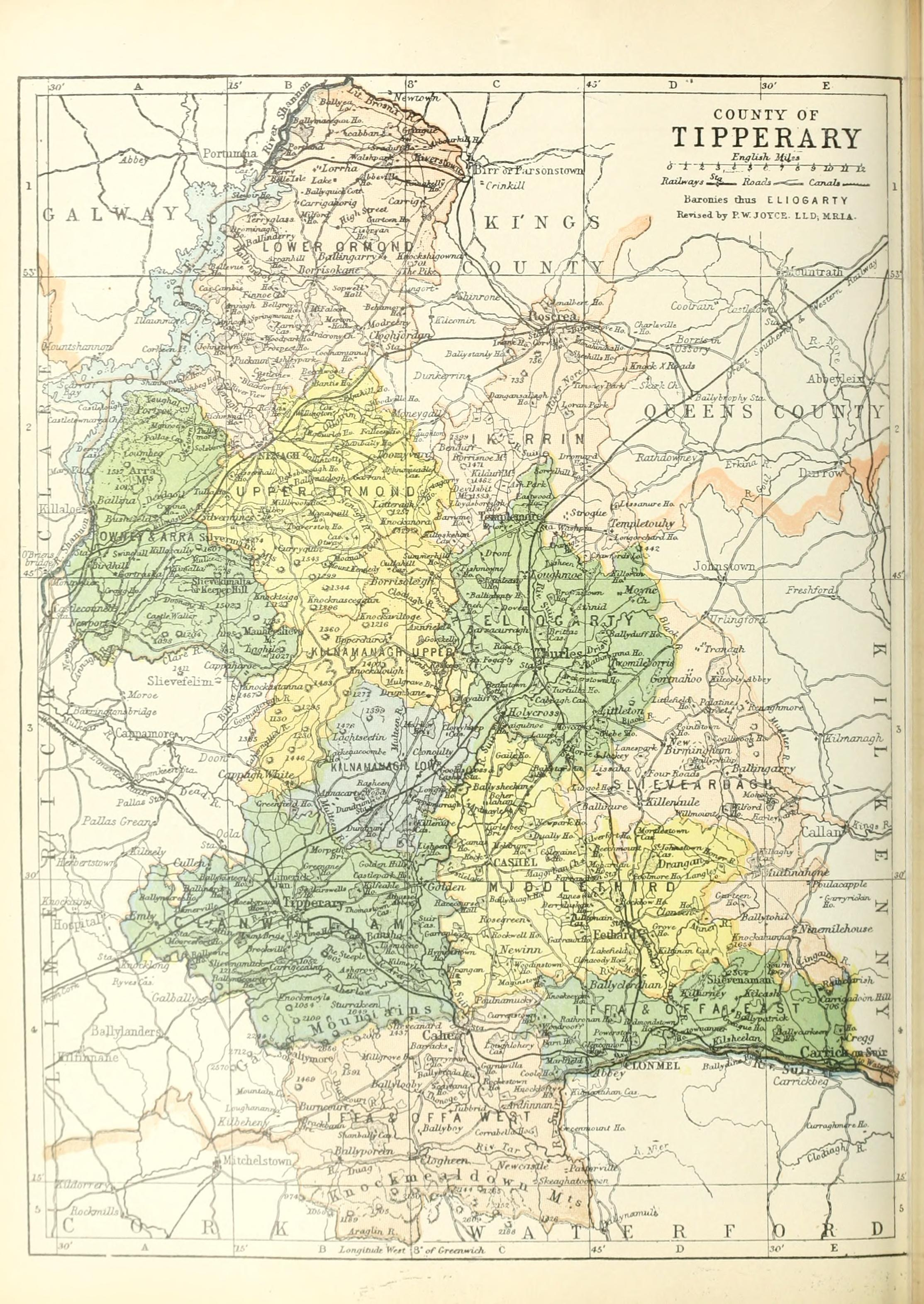
County Tipperary with subdivision into baronies

County Tipperary (Irish: Contae Thiobraid Árann) is a county in Ireland. It is in the province of Munster and the Southern Region. The county is named after the town of Tipperary, and was established in the early 13th century, shortly after the Norman invasion of Ireland. It is Ireland's largest inland county and shares a border with eight counties, more than any other. The population of the county was 167,895 at the 2022 census. The largest towns are Clonmel, Nenagh and Thurles.

Tipperary County Council is the local authority for the county. In 1838, County Tipperary was divided into two ridings, North and South. From 1899 until 2014, they had their own county councils. They were unified under the Local Government Reform Act 2014, which came into effect following the 2014 local elections on 3 June 2014.

== Geography ==
Tipperary is the sixth-largest of the 32 counties by area and the 12th largest by population. It is the third-largest of Munster's six counties by both size and population. It is also the largest landlocked county in Ireland.

Tipperary is bounded (clockwise) by counties Offaly, Laois, Kilkenny, Waterford, Cork, Limerick, Clare and Galway. Its eight neighbours are the most of any county on the island.

The region is part of the central plain of Ireland, but the diverse terrain contains several mountain ranges: the Knockmealdown, the Galtee, the Arra Hills and the Silvermine Mountains. Most of the county is drained by the River Suir; the north-western part by tributaries of the River Shannon; the eastern part by the River Nore; the south-western corner by the Munster Blackwater. No part of the county touches the coast. The centre is known as 'the Golden Vale', a rich pastoral stretch of land in the Suir basin which extends into counties Limerick and Cork. At 917 m, Galtymore is the highest point.

The Devil's Bit is a part of the Slieve Bloom range. The River Shannon flows along the northwest border with counties Limerick, Galway and Clare. The River Suir rises at the Devil's Bit and flows into the sea east of Waterford.

=== Baronies ===
There are 12 historic baronies in County Tipperary: Clanwilliam, Eliogarty, Iffa and Offa East, Iffa and Offa West, Ikerrin, Kilnamanagh Lower, Kilnamanagh Upper, Middle Third, Ormond Lower, Ormond Upper, Owney and Arra and Slievardagh.

=== Civil parishes and townlands ===
Parishes were delineated after the Down Survey as an intermediate subdivision, with multiple townlands per parish and multiple parishes per barony. The civil parishes had some use in local taxation and were included on the nineteenth century maps of the Ordnance Survey of Ireland. For poor law purposes, district electoral divisions replaced the civil parishes in the mid-nineteenth century. There are 199 civil parishes in the county. Townlands are the smallest officially defined geographical divisions in Ireland; there are 3,159 townlands in the county.

=== Largest towns ===
Historical population
Year	Pop.	±%
1600	23,454	—
1610	25,667	+9.4%
1653	31,597	+23.1%
1659	26,684	−15.5%
1821	346,896	+1200.0%
1831	402,563	+16.0%
1841	435,553	+8.2%
1851	331,567	−23.9%
1861	249,106	−24.9%
1871	216,713	−13.0%
1881	199,612	−7.9%
1891	173,188	−13.2%
1901	160,232	−7.5%
1911	152,433	−4.9%
1926	141,015	−7.5%
1936	137,835	−2.3%
1946	136,014	−1.3%
1951	133,313	−2.0%
1956	129,415	−2.9%
1961	123,822	−4.3%
1966	122,812	−0.8%
1971	123,565	+0.6%
1979	133,741	+8.2%
1981	135,261	+1.1%
1986	136,619	+1.0%
1991	132,772	−2.8%
1996	133,535	+0.6%
2002	140,131	+4.9%
2006	149,244	+6.5%
2011	158,754	+6.4%
2016	159,553	+0.5%
2022	167,690	+5.1%

Rank	Town	Population (2022 census)
1	Clonmel	18,369
2	Nenagh	9,895
3	Thurles	8,185
4	Carrick-on-Suir	5,752
5	Roscrea	5,542
6	Tipperary	5,387
7	Cashel	4,805
8	Cahir	3,679
9	Ballina	2,959
10	Newport	2,183
11	Templemore	2,005
12	Fethard	1,738

== History ==
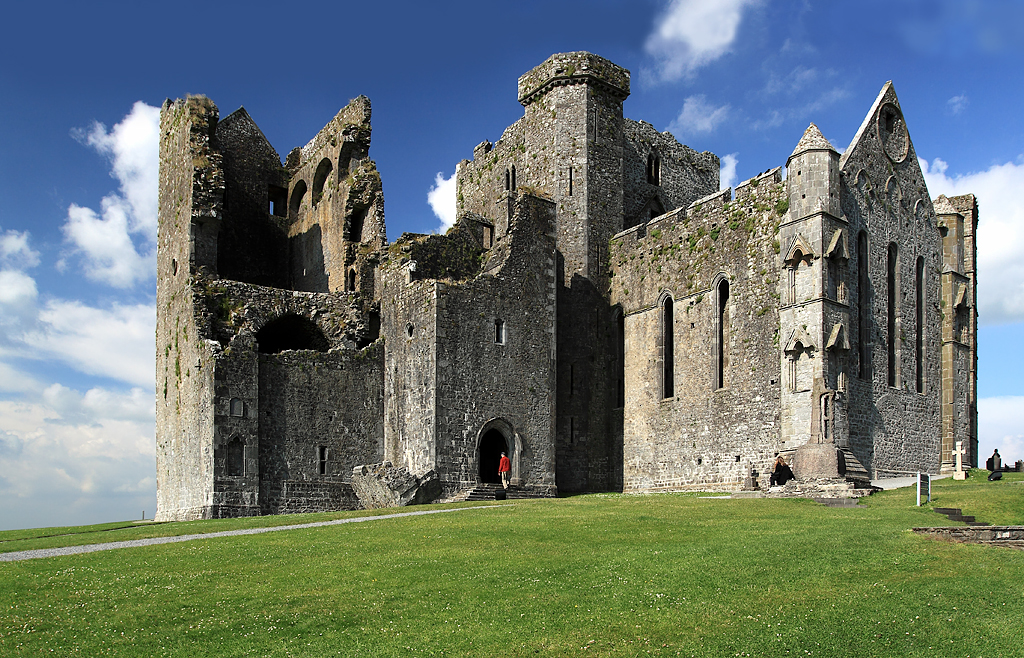
The Rock of Cashel, seat of the Kings of Munster

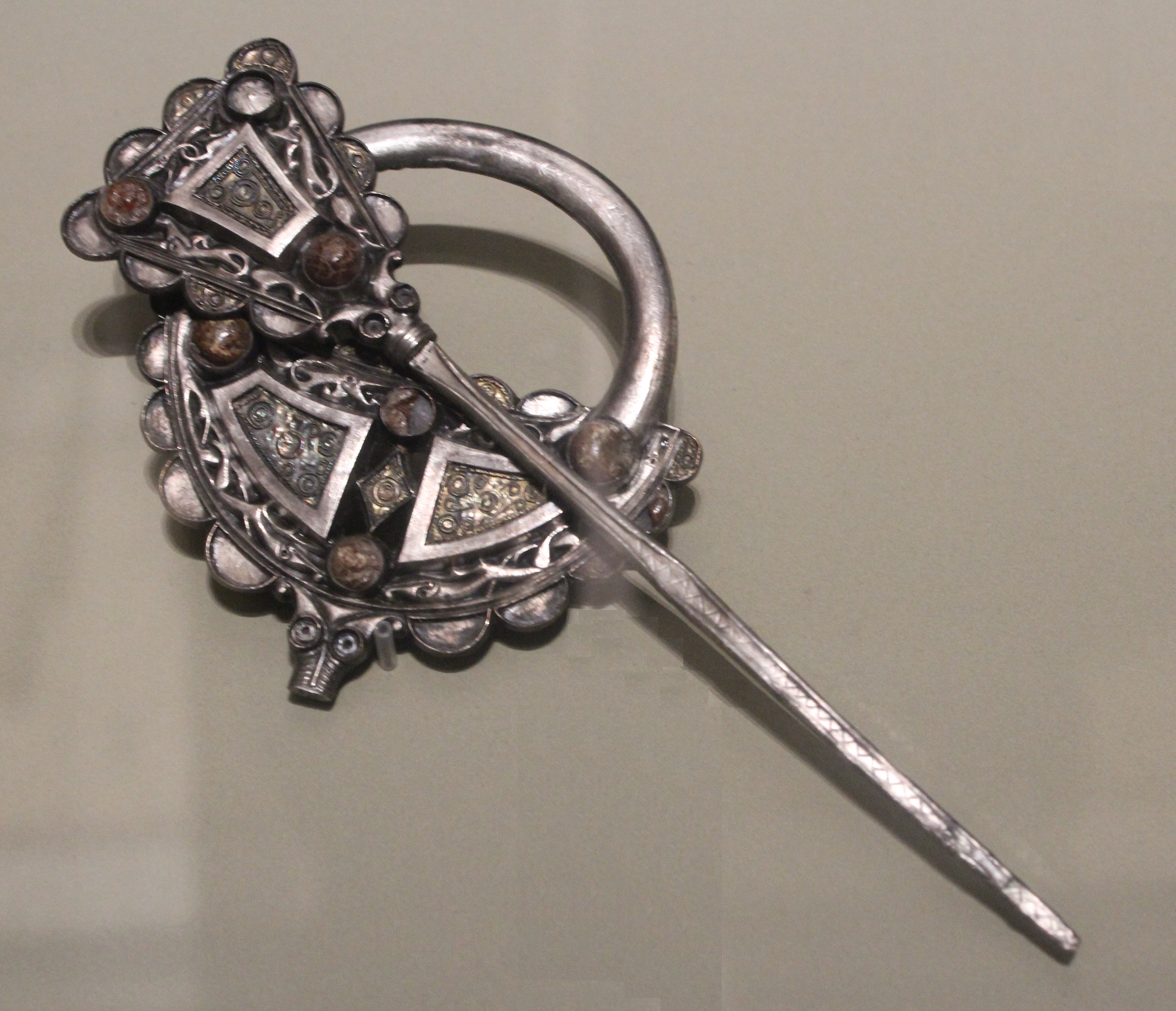
The Roscrea Brooch, 9th century

Following the Norman invasion of Ireland, the O'Kennedy ruled Kingdom of Ormond was claimed as a lordship. By 1210, the sheriffdom of Munster shired into the shires of Tipperary and Limerick. In 1328, Tipperary was granted to the Earls of Ormond as a county palatine or liberty. The grant excluded church lands such as the archiepiscopal see of Cashel, which formed the separate county of Cross Tipperary. Though the Earls gained jurisdiction over the church lands in 1662, "Tipperary and Cross Tipperary" were not definitively united until the County Palatine of Tipperary Act 1715, when the 2nd Duke of Ormond was attainted for supporting the Jacobite rising of 1715.

The county was divided once again in 1838. The county town of Clonmel, where the grand jury held its twice-yearly assizes, is at the southern limit of the county, and roads leading north were poor, making the journey inconvenient for jurors resident there. A petition to move the county town to a more central location was opposed by the MP for Clonmel, so instead the county was split into two "ridings"; the grand jury of the South Riding continued to meet in Clonmel, while that of the North Riding met in Nenagh. When the Local Government (Ireland) Act 1898 established county councils to replace the grand jury for civil functions, the ridings became separate "administrative counties" with separate county councils. Their names were changed from "Tipperary North/South Riding" to "North/South Tipperary" by the Local Government Act 2001, which redesignated all "administrative counties" as simply "counties". The Local Government Reform Act 2014 has amalgamated the two counties and restored a single county of Tipperary.

== Local government and politics ==
Following the 2014 local election, Tipperary County Council is the local authority for the county. The authority is the successor council to North Tipperary County Council and South Tipperary County Council which operated up until June 2014. The local authority is responsible for certain local services such as sanitation, planning and development, libraries, the collection of motor taxation, local roads and social housing.

Most of the county is in the Dáil constituency of Tipperary, which elects five deputies (TDs) to the Dáil. A small part of the county in the former rural district of Nenagh is in the constituency of Limerick City. The county is part of the South constituency for European elections.

== Culture ==
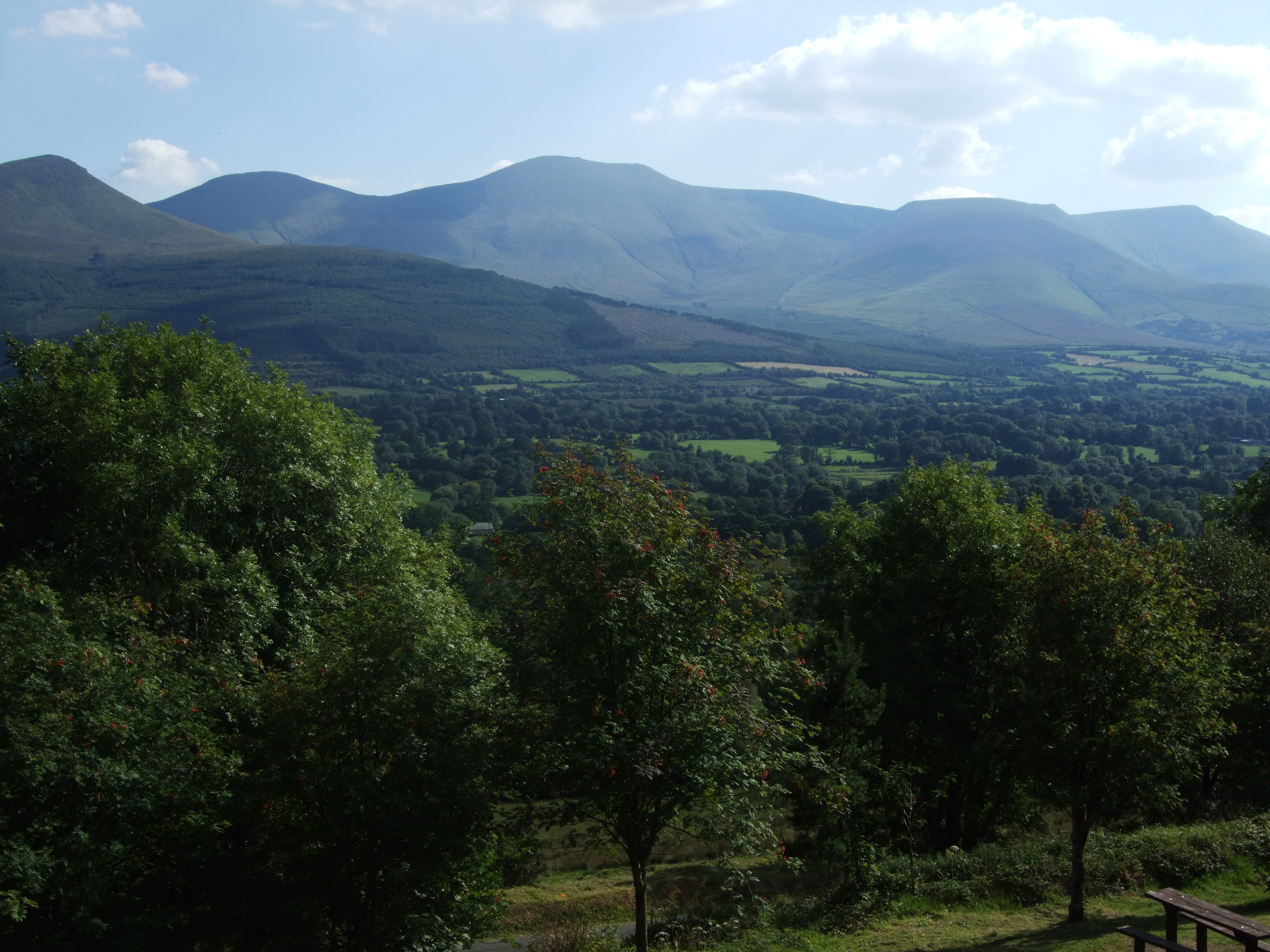
Galtee Mountains seen from the Glen of Aherlow

Tipperary is referred to as the "Premier County", a description attributed to Thomas Davis, Editor of The Nation newspaper in the 1840s as a tribute to the nationalistic feeling in Tipperary and said that "where Tipperary leads, Ireland follows". Tipperary was the subject of the famous song "It's a Long Way to Tipperary" written by Jack Judge, whose grandparents came from the county. It was popular with regiments of the British Army during World War I. The song "Slievenamon", which is traditionally associated with the county, was written by Charles Kickham from Mullinahone, and is commonly sung at sporting fixtures involving the county. Other songs about the county include "The Galtee Mountain Boy and "Tipperary".

== Irish language ==
There is no Gaeltacht in County Tipperary and consequently few Irish speakers. Nevertheless, there are five Gaelscoileanna (Irish language primary schools) and two Gaelcholáistí (Irish language secondary schools).

== Economy ==
The area around Clonmel is the economic hub of the county, due to manufacturing facilities owned by Bulmers (brewers) and Merck & Co. (pharmaceuticals) east of the town. There is much fertile land, especially in the region known as the Golden Vale, one of the richest agricultural areas in Ireland.

Tipperary is famous for its horse breeding industry and is the home of Coolmore Stud, the largest thoroughbred breeding operation in the world.

Tourism plays a significant role in County Tipperary – Lough Derg, Thurles, Rock of Cashel, Ormonde Castle, Ahenny High Crosses, Cahir Castle, Bru Boru Heritage Centre and Tipperary Crystal are some of the primary tourist destinations in the county.

== Transport ==
Road transport dominates in County Tipperary. The M7 motorway crosses the north of the county through Roscrea and Nenagh and the M8 motorway bisects the county from north of Two-Mile Borris to the County Limerick border. Both routes are among some of the busiest roads on the island. The Limerick to Waterford N24 crosses the southern half of Tipperary, travelling through Tipperary Town, Bansha, north of Cahir and around Clonmel and Carrick-on-Suir.

=== Railways ===
Tipperary also has a number of railway stations situated on the Dublin–Cork line such as Templemore, Thurles and Limerick Junction. The Dublin-to-Limerick line connect at Ballybrophy for services through north Tipperary. The Limerick–Waterford line connect to the Dublin–Cork line at Limerick Junction. The railway lines connect places in Tipperary with Cork, Dublin Heuston, Waterford, Limerick, Mallow, and Galway.

== Sports ==
County Tipperary has a strong association with the Gaelic Athletic Association, which was founded in Thurles in 1884. Tipperary GAA – a county board of the GAA – organizes local competitions for hurling, Gaelic football, camogie and handball. The board also enters county representative teams into the All-Ireland Senior Hurling Championship and All-Ireland Senior Football Championship.

Tipperary is the only county across any Gaelic game to have won an all-Ireland title in every decade since the 1880s. Hurling has traditionally been the county's dominant sport, however, with its hurling team having won 29 All-Ireland titles in comparison to the football team's four. Tipperary has the third-highest All-Ireland tally of any county hurling team, behind only Kilkenny and Cork.

Horse racing takes place at Tipperary Racecourse, Thurles Racecourse and Clonmel Racecourse.

== Places of interest ==
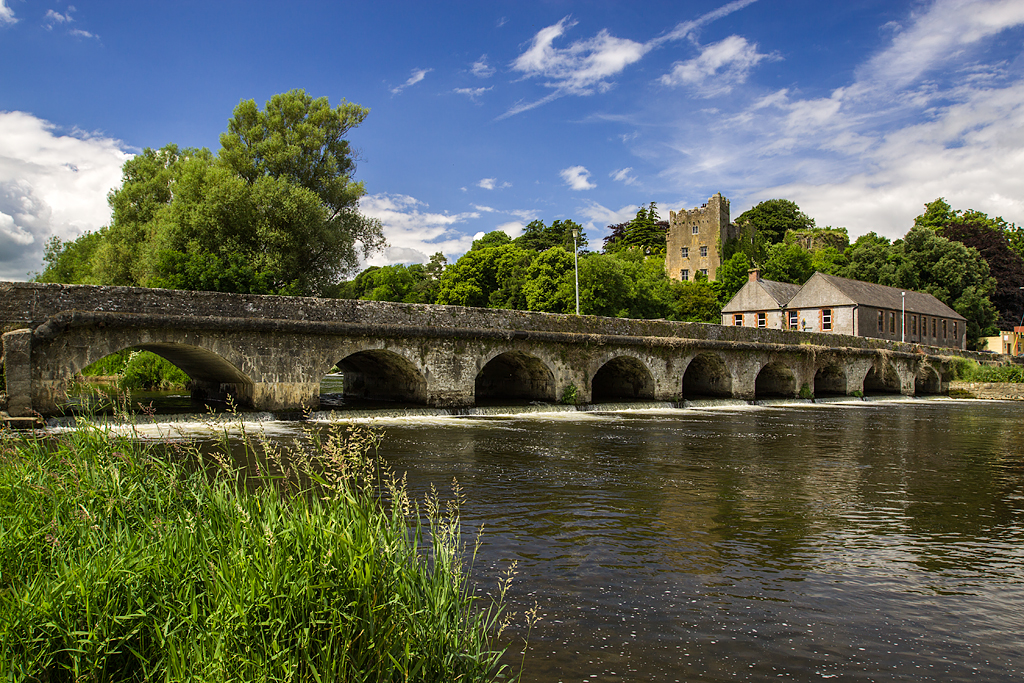
Ardfinnan Castle

- Ardfinnan Castle
- Athassel Priory
- Cahir Castle
- Coolmore Stud
- Devil's Bit – a mountain near Templemore
- Dromineer
- Galtymore – a munro, and the highest mountain in County Tipperary (919 m)
- Glen of Aherlow
- Glengarra Wood
- Holy Cross Abbey
- Kilcash Castle
- Lorrha
- Lough Derg
- Monaincha
- Mount St. Joseph Abbey, Roscrea
- Mitchelstown Cave
- Nenagh Castle
- Ormonde Castle, Carrick-on-Suir
- Redwood Castle (Castle Egan)
- Rock of Cashel
- Roscrea Castle
- Semple Stadium
- Slievenamon – mountain associated with many Irish legends (721 m)
- Timoney Standing Stones

== Notable people ==
- Anne Anderson, ambassador to the United States
- J. D. Bernal, twentieth-century scientist
- Rachael Blackmore, National Hunt Jockey
- Dan Breen, Irish Republican during the Irish War of Independence, later a TD for the county
- William Butler, nineteenth-century army officer, writer and adventurer
- Peter Campbell, founder of the Uruguayan navy
- The Clancy Brothers, folk music group
  - Paddy Clancy, singer and harmonicist
  - Tom Clancy, singer and actor
  - Bobby Clancy, singer and banjoist
  - Liam Clancy, singer and guitarist
- John Collison, President/Co-founder, Stripe
- Patrick Collison, CEO/Co-founder, Stripe
- Kerry Condon, actress
- Noel Coonan, former politician
- Frank Corcoran, composer
- Dayl Cronin, singer, member of boyband Hometown
- Frank Delaney, novelist and broadcaster
- John N. Dempsey, Governor of Connecticut (1961–1971)
- Dennis Dewane, American politician
- John M. Feehan, author and publisher
- Frank Fitzgerald, American politician
- Pádraigín Haicéad Irish-language poet and Dominican priest
- Mary Hanafin, former politician
- Lumsden Hare, stage and film actor
- Tom Hayes
- Séamus Healy
- Una Healy, singer, member of the girl group The Saturdays
- Patrick Hobbins, American politician
- Máire Hoctor
- Daniel Hough, first man to die in the American Civil War, he was accidentally killed by a cannon that went off prematurely at the Battle of Fort Sumter
- Geoffrey Keating, Irish historian
- Alan Kelly, politician
- Declan Kelly, CEO of Teneo
- Niamh Kennedy, model, winner of Miss Ireland 2016
- Tom Kiely, Olympic gold medalist
- Shane Long, former footballer
- Denis Lynch, show jumper
- Thomas MacDonagh, Irish Republican
- Shane MacGowan, musician and songwriter, member of the Pogues
- Marty Maher, athletic instructor for 50 years at West Point, subject of the film The Long Gray Line
- Martin Mansergh, former politician
- John Morrissey, New York gang-leader, boxer and US congressman
- Máiréad Nesbitt, Irish fiddler and former member for Celtic Woman
- Fergus O'Dowd
- Niall O'Dowd, publisher, Irish Central
- Tomás Ó hÍcí, Irish scribe
- Mathghamhain Ó hIfearnáin, Irish poet
- Martin O'Meara, recipient of the Victoria Cross
- Frank Patterson, tenor
- Ramsay Weston Phipps, military historian
- Rachel Pilkington actor
- Rozanna Purcell, model, represented Ireland at Miss Universe 2010
- Lena Rice, Wimbledon tennis champion
- Adi Roche, campaigner for peace, humanitarian aid and education, founder and chief executive of Chernobyl Children International
- Donal Ryan, writer
- Tony Ryan, founder and chairman GPA and Ryanair philanthropist
- Richard Lalor Sheil, politician, writer and orator
- Pat Shortt, actor, comedian and entertainer
- Dylan Slevin, Professional Darts player
- Laurence Sterne, author and clergyman, most famous for Tristram Shandy
- Seán Treacy, Irish Republican during the Irish War of Independence
- Aoife Walsh, model, winner of Miss Ireland 2013
- The 2 Johnnies, musicians and entertainers

== See also ==
- Annals of Inisfallen
- High Sheriff of Tipperary
- List of civil parishes of County Tipperary
- List of abbeys and priories in the Republic of Ireland (County Tipperary)
- List of National Monuments in County Tipperary
- Lord Lieutenant of Tipperary
- Tipperary Hill, a neighbourhood in Syracuse, New York, United States, inhabited by many descendants of County Tipperary.
- Vehicle registration plates of the Republic of Ireland
