= 2024 Tipperary County Council election =

Part of the 2024 Irish local elections

- 7 June 2024

All 40 seats on Tipperary County Council 21 seats needed for a majority
	First party	Second party	Third party
Party	Fianna Fáil	Fine Gael	Sinn Féin
Last election	9	12	2
Seats before	9	12	3
Seats won	10	10	2
Seat change	▲1	▼2	Steady
	Fourth party	Fifth party	Sixth party
Party	Labour	Workers and Unemployed	Independent
Last election	1	1	15
Seats before	1	1	14
Seats won	3	1	14
Seat change	▲2	Steady	▼1
- Results by Local Electoral Area

An election to all 40 seats on Tipperary County Council was held on 7 June 2024 as part of the 2024 Irish local elections. County Tipperary is divided into 8 local electoral areas (LEAs) to elect councillors for a five-year term of office on the electoral system of proportional representation by means of the single transferable vote (PR-STV).

== Results by party ==
Party	First-preference votes			Seats				
Party	Votes	% FPv	Swing (pp)	Cand.	2019	Out.	Elected 2024	Change
Fianna Fáil	16,406	21.98	▼4.18	13	9	9	10	▲1
Fine Gael	15,183	20.34	▼6.73	12	12	12	10	▼2
Sinn Féin	6,777	9.08	▲2.77	11	2	3	2	Steady
Labour	5,167	6.92	▲1.81	4	1	1	3	▲2
Workers and Unemployed	1,887	2.53	▼0.98	2	1	1	1	Steady
Green	664	0.89	▲0.29	3	0	0	0	Steady
Independent Ireland	594	0.80	New	1	New	0	0	New
National Party	381	0.51	New	1	New	0	0	New
Irish Freedom	299	0.40	New	1	New	0	0	New
Social Democrats	99	0.13	New	1	New	0	0	New
Independent	27,187	36.42	▲5.53	21	15	14	14	▼1
Total Valid	74,644	99.16						
Spoilt votes	635	0.84						
Total	75,279	100.00	—	70	40	40	40	Steady
Registered voters/Turnout	137,476	54.76						

== Retiring incumbents ==
The following councillors did not seek re-election:

Constituency	Councillor	Party
Roscrea-Templemore	Noel Coonan	Fine Gael
Cashel-Tipperary	Michael FitzGerald	Fine Gael
Nenagh	Ger Darcy	Fine Gael
Thurles	Seamus Hanafin	Fianna Fáil
Nenagh	Hughie McGrath	Independent
Newport	John McGrath	Independent

== Results by local electoral area ==
*: Outgoing councillor elected in 2019.
†: Outgoing councillor coopted subsequent to the 2019 election.

=== Cahir ===
Cahir: 4 Seats
Party	Candidate	FPv%	Count							
Party	Candidate	FPv%	1	2	3	4	5	6	7	8
Independent	Máirín McGrath	28.94%	2,079							
Independent	Andy Moloney	24.53%	1,762							
Fine Gael	Marie Murphy	16.05%	1,153	1,320	1,423	1,428	1,456			
Fianna Fáil	Micheál Anglim	12.61%	906	1,053	1,116	1,129	1,143	1,174	1,218	1,462
Independent	Tom Hennessy	5.76%	414	540	585	620	633	727	839	938
Fianna Fáil	PJ English	4.81%	346	420	457	464	465	486	516	
Sinn Féin	Cathal Ó hÉanna	3.09%	222	271	308	311	355	370		
Independent	Bill Fitzgerald	1.85%	133	172	191	209	217			
Social Democrats	Alan Moynihan	1.38%	99	120	134	135				
Independent	Shane Smith	0.96%	69	88	95					
Electorate: 12,428 Valid: 7,183 Spoilt: 49 Quota: 1,437 Turnout: 7,232 (58.19%)

=== Carrick-on-Suir ===
Carrick-on-Suir: 5 Seats
Party	Candidate	FPv%	Count				
Party	Candidate	FPv%	1	2	3	4	5
Fianna Fáil	Imelda Goldsboro	20.98%	1,898				
Sinn Féin	David Dunne	18.34%	1,659				
Labour	Michael Brennan	16.43%	1,486	1,611			
Fine Gael	Mark Fitzgerald	14.80%	1,339	1,442	1,451	1,497	1,545
Fianna Fáil	Kieran Bourke	14.75%	1,334	1,396	1,506	1,518	
Independent	Kevin O'Meara	11.41%	1,032	1,121	1,138	1,170	1,319
Irish Freedom	Martin Murphy	3.30%	299	310	325	330	
Electorate: 16,763 Valid: 9,047 Spoilt: 57 Quota: 1,508 Turnout: 9,104 (54.31%)

=== Cashel–Tipperary ===
Cashel–Tipperary: 7 seats
Party	Candidate	FPv%	Count										
Party	Candidate	FPv%	1	2	3	4	5	6	7	8	9	10	11
Independent	John O’Heney	20.31%	2,534										
Fine Gael	Declan Burgess	14.84%	1,852										
Independent	Liam Browne	13.34%	1,665										
Fianna Fáil	Roger Kennedy	9.76%	1,218	1,290	1,417	1,434	1,479	1,488	1,566				
Fine Gael	Mary Hanna Hourigan	9.22%	1,151	1,325	1,371	1,379	1,384	1,414	1,535	1,615			
Fine Gael	John Crosse	8.20%	1,023	1,206	1,259	1,264	1,272	1,315	1,443	1,518	1,547	1,739	
Sinn Féin	Annemarie Ryan	6.14%	766	934	939	974	978	1,020	1,038	1,077	1,079	1,186	1,230
Sinn Féin	Tony Black	5.67%	708	817	822	912	925	966	973	1,012	1,017	1,086	1,117
Fianna Fáil	Jacqui Finnan	3.26%	407	518	526	531	536	577	604	638	650		
National Party	John McGrath	3.05%	381	420	422	424	434	468	475				
Fine Gael	Matthew Fogarty	2.72%	340	388	420	423	428	441					
Independent	Peadar O'Donnell	2.08%	259	318	320	324	334						
Sinn Féin	Molly Browne	1.40%	174	185	197								
Electorate: 23,832 Valid: 12,478 Spoilt: 97 Quota: 1,560 Turnout: 12,575 (52.77%)

=== Clonmel ===
Clonmel: 6 Seats
Party	Candidate	FPv%	Count									
Party	Candidate	FPv%	1	2	3	4	5	6	7	8	9	10
Fine Gael	Michael Murphy	28.23%	2,746									
Workers and Unemployed	Pat English	16.18%	1,574									
Fianna Fáil	Siobhán Ambrose	15.54%	1,512									
Fine Gael	John FitzGerald	11.66%	1,134	1,824								
Independent	Richie Molloy	7.67%	746	1,097	1,312	1,351	1,409					
Independent	Niall P Dennehy	6.38%	621	764	857	886	914	964	980	1,103	1,115	1,291
Independent	Deirdre Dempsey	3.30%	321	338	344	350	355	369	376			
Sinn Féin	Dean McGrath	3.29%	320	360	369	378	382	399	646	670	671	832
Workers and Unemployed	Teresa Johnson	3.22%	313	375	411	500	512	570	593	664	670	
Sinn Féin	Natasha Dingivan	2.90%	282	303	309	317	322	333				
Green	Myriam Madigan	1.62%	158	190	259	263	273					
Electorate: 19,734 Valid: 9,727 Spoilt: 110 Quota: 1,390 Turnout: 9,837 (49.85%)

=== Nenagh ===
Nenagh: 5 Seats
Party	Candidate	FPv%	Count			
Party	Candidate	FPv%	1	2	3	4
Independent	Joe Hannigan	21.37%	2,233			
Independent	Michael O'Meara	17.44%	1,822			
Fianna Fáil	Ryan O'Meara	14.61%	1,527	1,651	1,747	
Independent	Séamus Morris	13.72%	1,434	1,585	1,633	1,851
Labour	Louise Morgan Walsh	11.58%	1,210	1,272	1,390	1,749
Sinn Féin	Damian O’Donoghue	10.49%	1,096	1,120	1,167	1,212
Fine Gael	Eleanor Maher	7.06%	738	845	916	
Green	Iva Pocock	3.72%	389	412		
Electorate: 18,622 Valid: 10,449 Spoilt: 78 Quota: 1,742 Turnout: 10,527 (56.53%)

=== Newport ===
Newport: 4 seats
Party	Candidate	FPv%	Count		
Party	Candidate	FPv%	1	2	3
Labour	Fiona Bonfield	28.93%	2,346		
Independent	Pamela Quirke O’Meara	20.53%	1,665		
Fine Gael	Phyll Bugler	20.17%	1,636		
Fianna Fáil	John Carroll	15.40%	1,249	1,543	1,595
Independent Ireland	Eddie O'Gorman	7.32%	594	676	713
Sinn Féin	Gavin Ryan	6.10%	495	780	819
Independent	David Ahern	1.54%	125	187	
Electorate: 14,247 Valid: 8,110 Spoilt: 54 Quota: 1,623 Turnout: 8,164 (57.30%)

=== Roscrea–Templemore ===
Roscrea–Templemore: 4 seats
Party	Candidate	FPv%	Count					
Party	Candidate	FPv%	1	2	3	4	5	6
Fianna Fáil	Michael Smith	29.51%	2,460					
Independent	Shane Lee	26.76%	2,231					
Independent	Eddie Moran	17.07%	1,423	1,599				
Fine Gael	Willie Kennedy	13.71%	1,143	1,319	1,398	1,438	1,483	1,616
Fianna Fáil	Deirdre Ryan	6.30%	525	810	859	886	924	1,106
Sinn Féin	Breandán Ó Conchúir	3.75%	313	358	405	442	467	
Labour	Jordan Lewis	1.50%	125	174	225	245		
Green	Aisling Maloney	1.40%	117	178	227	257	297	
Electorate: 15,059 Valid: 8,337 Spoilt: 101 Quota: 1,668 Turnout: 8,438 (56.03%)

=== Thurles ===
Thurles: 5 Seats
Party	Candidate	FPv%	Count			
Party	Candidate	FPv%	1	2	3	4
Independent	Jim Ryan	26.15%	2,435			
Independent	Micheál Lowry	23.45%	2,184			
Fianna Fáil	Sean Ryan	17.59%	1,638			
Fianna Fáil	Kay Cahill Skehan	14.88%	1,386	1,777		
Fine Gael	Peggy Ryan	9.96%	928	1,097	1,504	1,640
Sinn Féin	Dan Harty	7.97%	742	1,064	1,288	1,376
Electorate: 16,791 Valid: 9,313 Spoilt: 89 Quota: 1,553 Turnout: 9,402 (55.99%)
