= 2014 Tipperary County Council election =

Part of 2014 Irish local elections

| ← 2009 North 2009 South | 23 May 2014 | 2019 → |

All 40 seats on Tipperary County Council 21 seats needed for a majority
| | First party | Second party | Third party |
|---|---|---|---|
| Party | Fine Gael | Fianna Fáil | Sinn Féin |
| Seats won | 10 | 10 | 5 |
| Seat change | ▼6 | ▼2 | ▲4 |
| | Fourth party | Fifth party | Sixth party |
| Party | Labour | Workers and Unemployed | Independent |
| Seats won | 1 | 1 | 13 |
| Seat change | ▼5 | ▼1 | ▲3 |
- Map showing the area of Tipperary County Council

An election to all 40 seats on Tipperary County Council was held on 23 May 2014 as part of the 2014 Irish local elections, contested by a field of 85 candidates. This was a reduction from a combined total of 47 seats at the previous election: 21 at the 2009 North Tipperary election and 27 at the 2009 South Tipperary election. The former counties of North Tipperary and South Tipperary were amalgamated under the Local Government Reform Act 2014. The town councils of Carrick-on-Suir, Cashel, Nenagh, Templemore, Tipperary and Thurles and the borough council of Clonmel were also abolished.

County Tipperary was divided into five local electoral areas (LEAs) to elect councillors for a five-year term of office on the electoral system of proportional representation by means of the single transferable vote (PR-STV).

== Results by party ==
| Party | Seats | ± | 1st pref | FPv% |
|---|---|---|---|---|
| Independent | 13 | +3 | 22,197 | 29.48 |
| Fine Gael | 10 | −6 | 19,599 | 26.03 |
| Fianna Fáil | 10 | −2 | 17,833 | 23.68 |
| Sinn Féin | 5 | +4 | 7,507 | 9.97 |
| Labour | 1 | −5 | 5,989 | 7.95 |
| Workers and Unemployed | 1 | −1 | 1,927 | 2.56 |
| People Before Profit | 0 | 0 | 174 | 0.23 |
| Direct Democracy | 0 | 0 | 73 | 0.10 |
| Total | 40 | −7 | 75,299 | 100.00 |

== Results by local electoral area ==
*: Outgoing councillor.

=== Carrick-on-Suir ===
Carrick-on-Suir: 6 seats
| Party | Candidate | FPv% | Count | | | | | | |
| Party | Candidate | FPv% | 1 | 2 | 3 | 4 | 5 | 6 | 7 |
|---|---|---|---|---|---|---|---|---|---|
| Sinn Féin | David Dunne | 14.15 | 1,398 | 1,429 | | | | | |
| Fianna Fáil | Imelda Goldsboro | 13.35 | 1,319 | 1,399 | 1,404 | 1,418 | | | |
| Independent | Eddie O'Meara | 10.80 | 1,067 | 1,091 | 1,092 | 1,132 | 1,252 | 1,291 | 1,418 |
| Fine Gael | Louise McLoughlin | 9.29 | 918 | 945 | 946 | 963 | 1,092 | 1,129 | 1,309 |
| Independent | Kieran Bourke | 9.22 | 911 | 916 | 917 | 1,060 | 1,066 | 1,283 | 1,318 |
| Fine Gael | Joe Brennan | 8.19 | 809 | 827 | 828 | 912 | 1,011 | 1,106 | 1,159 |
| Fine Gael | John Fahey | 7.99 | 789 | 865 | 868 | 872 | 979 | 999 | 1,250 |
| Labour | Liam Hayes | 6.48 | 640 | 759 | 763 | 771 | 821 | 856 | |
| Fine Gael | Noel Fitzgerald | 5.64 | 557 | 587 | 587 | 591 | | | |
| Fianna Fáil | Sylvia Cooney-Sheehan | 5.43 | 536 | 543 | 543 | 632 | 654 | | |
| Independent | Pierce O'Loughlin | 4.76 | 470 | 471 | 472 | | | | |
| Labour | Michael Cleere | 4.69 | 463 | | | | | | |
Electorate: 17,028 Valid: 9,877 (58.00%) Spoilt: 125 Quota: 1,412 Turnout: 10,002 (58.74%)

=== Cashel–Tipperary ===
Cashel–Tipperary: 7 seats
| Party | Candidate | FPv% | Count | | | | | | | | | |
| Party | Candidate | FPv% | 1 | 2 | 3 | 4 | 5 | 6 | 7 | 8 | 9 | 10 |
|---|---|---|---|---|---|---|---|---|---|---|---|---|
| Fine Gael | Michael Fitzgerald | 18.29 | 2,272 | | | | | | | | | |
| Sinn Féin | Martin Browne | 11.26 | 1,399 | 1,458 | 1,499 | 1,515 | 1,563 | | | | | |
| Independent | Denis Leahy | 9.32 | 1,157 | 1,230 | 1,250 | 1,324 | 1,325 | 1,485 | 1,512 | 1,767 | | |
| Fine Gael | Mary Hourigan | 9.22 | 1,145 | 1,277 | 1,288 | 1,323 | 1,364 | 1,427 | 1,564 | | | |
| Fine Gael | John Crosse | 8.49 | 1,054 | 1,176 | 1,185 | 1,212 | 1,247 | 1,292 | 1,429 | 1,642 | | |
| Fianna Fáil | Roger Kennedy | 8.17 | 1,015 | 1,066 | 1,083 | 1,118 | 1,162 | 1,183 | 1,377 | 1,444 | 1,482 | 1,519 |
| Fianna Fáil | Joseph O'Connell | 7.17 | 890 | 927 | 933 | 1,024 | 1,038 | 1,060 | 1,103 | 1,165 | 1,196 | 1,230 |
| Independent | Tom Wood | 7.12 | 884 | 919 | 950 | 957 | 1,047 | 1,074 | 1,196 | 1,234 | 1,259 | 1,277 |
| Labour | Mick Byrnes | 5.44 | 676 | 728 | 730 | 747 | 751 | 822 | 847 | | | |
| Fine Gael | Colm Taylor | 5.12 | 636 | 694 | 703 | 710 | 786 | 800 | | | | |
| Independent | Jacqui Finnan | 3.54 | 440 | 462 | 487 | 505 | 506 | | | | | |
| Fianna Fáil | Brian Rafferty | 2.59 | 322 | 342 | 350 | | | | | | | |
| Independent | Eoghan Lawrence | 2.58 | 320 | 367 | 382 | 383 | | | | | | |
| Independent | June Molony | 1.10 | 137 | 144 | | | | | | | | |
| Direct Democracy | John O'Connor | 0.59 | 73 | 77 | | | | | | | | |
Electorate: 21,539 Valid: 12,420 (57.66%) Spoilt: 140 Quota: 1,553 Turnout: 12,560 (58.31%)

=== Clonmel ===
Clonmel: 9 seats
| Party | Candidate | FPv% | Count | | | | | | | | | | | | | |
| Party | Candidate | FPv% | 1 | 2 | 3 | 4 | 5 | 6 | 7 | 8 | 9 | 10 | 11 | 12 | 13 | 14 |
|---|---|---|---|---|---|---|---|---|---|---|---|---|---|---|---|---|
| Independent | Martin Lonergan | 11.16 | 1,748 | | | | | | | | | | | | | |
| Fine Gael | Michael Murphy | 9.68 | 1,517 | 1,523 | 1,528 | 1,531 | 1,535 | 1,541 | 1,565 | 1,565 | 1,583 | | | | | |
| Workers and Unemployed | Pat English | 9.41 | 1,474 | 1,480 | 1,495 | 1,526 | 1,563 | 1,575 | | | | | | | | |
| Fianna Fáil | Siobhán Ambrose | 9.25 | 1,449 | 1,457 | 1,464 | 1,464 | 1,476 | 1,484 | 1,513 | 1,513 | 1,525 | 1,529 | 1,610 | | | |
| Independent | Andy Moloney | 8.98 | 1,407 | 1,430 | 1,438 | 1,453 | 1,457 | 1,484 | 1,499 | 1,500 | 1,629 | | | | | |
| Fine Gael | Marie Murphy | 6.77 | 1,060 | 1,077 | 1,078 | 1,087 | 1,089 | 1,089 | 1,094 | 1,099 | 1,099 | 1,137 | 1,151 | 1,166 | 1,309 | 1,326 |
| Fianna Fáil | Michael Anglim | 6.72 | 1,053 | 1,085 | 1,086 | 1,092 | 1,092 | 1,102 | 1,102 | 1,102 | 1,139 | 1,148 | 1,170 | 1,427 | 1,429 | 1,483 |
| Sinn Féin | Catherine Carey | 5.70 | 893 | 900 | 909 | 916 | 941 | 1,124 | 1,175 | 1,179 | 1,199 | 1,204 | 1,251 | 1,269 | 1,387 | 1,462 |
| Fine Gael | Liam Ahearn | 5.59 | 875 | 883 | 885 | 889 | 891 | 894 | 896 | 896 | 917 | 930 | 950 | 966 | 982 | 1,098 |
| Independent | Richie Molloy | 4.72 | 739 | 771 | 779 | 787 | 805 | 811 | 844 | 844 | 865 | 869 | 971 | 994 | 1,185 | 1,403 |
| Fine Gael | Joe Leahy | 4.21 | 660 | 663 | 666 | 667 | 673 | 675 | 689 | 689 | 701 | 703 | 743 | 750 | 806 | |
| Fianna Fáil | P.J. English | 3.19 | 499 | 511 | 512 | 517 | 519 | 530 | 536 | 536 | 547 | 551 | 561 | | | |
| Independent | Gabrielle Egan | 2.96 | 463 | 465 | 470 | 474 | 489 | 491 | 545 | 545 | 557 | 560 | 652 | 660 | | |
| Independent | Darren Ryan | 2.90 | 455 | 460 | 465 | 466 | 478 | 480 | 515 | 517 | 525 | 529 | | | | |
| Labour | Seanie Lonergan | 2.34 | 367 | 375 | 375 | 389 | 392 | 403 | 411 | 411 | | | | | | |
| Workers and Unemployed | Pearl Sheehan | 1.90 | 298 | 299 | 303 | 336 | 351 | 354 | | | | | | | | |
| Sinn Féin | Kevin Brunnick | 1.84 | 288 | 292 | 293 | 306 | 315 | | | | | | | | | |
| People Before Profit | Anne Condon | 1.11 | 174 | 176 | 186 | 187 | | | | | | | | | | |
| Workers and Unemployed | Martina Maher | 0.99 | 155 | 159 | 159 | | | | | | | | | | | |
| Independent | Eoin O'Flaherty | 0.59 | 92 | 93 | | | | | | | | | | | | |
Electorate: 26,765 Valid: 15,666 (58.53%) Spoilt: 178 Quota: 1,567 Turnout: 15,844 (59.20%)

=== Nenagh ===
Nenagh: 9 seats
| Party | Candidate | FPv% | Count | | | | | | | | | | | | |
| Party | Candidate | FPv% | 1 | 2 | 3 | 4 | 5 | 6 | 7 | 8 | 9 | 10 | 11 | 12 | 13 |
|---|---|---|---|---|---|---|---|---|---|---|---|---|---|---|---|
| Independent | Joe Hannigan | 10.89 | 2,028 | | | | | | | | | | | | |
| Sinn Féin | Seamus Morris | 9.29 | 1,731 | 1,750 | 1,757 | 1,768 | 1,852 | 1,891 | | | | | | | |
| Independent | Michael O'Meara | 8.36 | 1,557 | 1,592 | 1,624 | 1,692 | 1,701 | 1,718 | 1,777 | 1,795 | 1,819 | 1,829 | 1,883 | | |
| Fianna Fáil | John Carroll | 7.96 | 1,483 | 1,495 | 1,499 | 1,502 | 1,544 | 1,569 | 1,668 | 1,703 | 1,768 | 1,864 | | | |
| Fianna Fáil | Mattie (Coole) Ryan | 7.18 | 1,338 | 1,343 | 1,343 | 1,345 | 1,347 | 1,359 | 1,487 | 1,513 | 1,554 | 1,729 | 1,786 | 1,788 | 1,923 |
| Fine Gael | Dr. Phyll Bugler | 6.33 | 1,178 | 1,181 | 1,183 | 1,186 | 1,192 | 1,225 | 1,237 | 1,250 | 1,324 | 1,371 | 1,447 | 1,449 | 1,788 |
| Independent | Hughie McGrath | 5.80 | 1,081 | 1,094 | 1,101 | 1,110 | 1,179 | 1,225 | 1,258 | 1,390 | 1,509 | 1,522 | 1,758 | 1,768 | 1,877 |
| Independent | John McGrath | 5.49 | 1,023 | 1,027 | 1,027 | 1,031 | 1,048 | 1,062 | 1,073 | 1,084 | 1,097 | 1,294 | 1,311 | 1,312 | 1,409 |
| Fine Gael | Gerard Darcy | 5.48 | 1,021 | 1,049 | 1,063 | 1,073 | 1,078 | 1,104 | 1,209 | 1,225 | 1,339 | 1,347 | 1,433 | 1,434 | 1,731 |
| Labour | Fiona Bonfield | 5.22 | 973 | 974 | 982 | 984 | 994 | 1,004 | 1,011 | 1,065 | 1,080 | 1,304 | 1,543 | 1,545 | 1,622 |
| Fine Gael | Tom Berkery | 5.12 | 953 | 958 | 958 | 960 | 974 | 1,027 | 1,034 | 1,055 | 1,178 | 1,197 | 1,288 | 1,288 | |
| Fianna Fáil | Martin Kennedy | 4.37 | 814 | 815 | 815 | 821 | 824 | 829 | 856 | 860 | 867 | | | | |
| Labour | Virginia O'Dowd | 3.70 | 690 | 698 | 718 | 721 | 736 | 765 | 781 | 957 | 1,080 | 1,088 | | | |
| Fine Gael | Tom Moylan | 3.61 | 672 | 675 | 675 | 677 | 683 | 721 | 733 | 778 | | | | | |
| Labour | Lalor McGee | 2.95 | 550 | 553 | 564 | 566 | 581 | 623 | 626 | | | | | | |
| Fianna Fáil | Eamonn Spillane | 2.83 | 527 | 535 | 541 | 551 | 554 | 558 | | | | | | | |
| Fine Gael | Conor Delaney | 2.20 | 409 | 410 | 410 | 417 | 422 | | | | | | | | |
| Independent | Michael Dillon | 1.59 | 296 | 302 | 303 | 333 | | | | | | | | | |
| Independent | Patrick Cahalan | 0.98 | 183 | 189 | 194 | | | | | | | | | | |
| Labour | Greg Starr | 0.63 | 117 | 121 | | | | | | | | | | | |
Electorate: 29,215 Valid: 18,624 (63.75%) Spoilt: 193 Quota: 1,863 Turnout: 18,817 (64.41%)

=== Templemore–Thurles ===
Templemore–Thurles: 9 seats
| Party | Candidate | FPv% | Count | | | | | | | | | | | |
| Party | Candidate | FPv% | 1 | 2 | 3 | 4 | 5 | 6 | 7 | 8 | 9 | 10 | 11 | 12 |
|---|---|---|---|---|---|---|---|---|---|---|---|---|---|---|
| Fianna Fáil | Michael Smith | 13.72 | 2,568 | | | | | | | | | | | |
| Independent | Jim Ryan | 9.75 | 1,825 | 1,849 | 1,856 | 1,896 | | | | | | | | |
| Fianna Fáil | Seamus Hanafin | 8.79 | 1,644 | 1,694 | 1,701 | 1,716 | 1,788 | 1,890 | | | | | | |
| Independent | Michael Lowry Jnr | 8.10 | 1,515 | 1,530 | 1,541 | 1,557 | 1,670 | 1,730 | 1,744 | 1,747 | 1,802 | 1,929 | | |
| Independent | Willie Kennedy | 7.44 | 1,393 | 1,403 | 1,406 | 1,431 | 1,465 | 1,486 | 1,495 | 1,496 | 1,550 | 1,610 | 1,615 | 1,763 |
| Sinn Féin | David Doran | 6.86 | 1,283 | 1,289 | 1,290 | 1,303 | 1,370 | 1,417 | 1,683 | 1,686 | 1,711 | 1,871 | 1,887 | |
| Fianna Fáil | John Hogan | 6.84 | 1,279 | 1,387 | 1,397 | 1,428 | 1,451 | 1,469 | 1,496 | 1,497 | 1,571 | 1,616 | 1,621 | 1,774 |
| Fianna Fáil | Jackie Cahill | 5.86 | 1,097 | 1,158 | 1,162 | 1,176 | 1,228 | 1,285 | 1,295 | 1,298 | 1,362 | 1,524 | 1,541 | 1,622 |
| Fine Gael | Joe Bourke | 4.57 | 856 | 887 | 937 | 1,047 | 1,053 | 1,110 | 1,123 | 1,124 | 1,456 | 1,514 | 1,518 | 1,887 |
| Independent | Eddie Moran | 4.32 | 808 | 860 | 878 | 949 | 980 | 992 | 1,028 | 1,029 | 1,136 | 1,157 | 1,165 | |
| Labour | Shane Lee | 4.20 | 786 | 949 | 1,046 | 1,071 | 1,077 | 1,078 | 1,250 | 1,250 | 1,280 | 1,386 | 1,388 | 1,505 |
| Labour | John Kennedy | 3.89 | 727 | 729 | 733 | 739 | 783 | 853 | 859 | 863 | 899 | | | |
| Fine Gael | Liam Brereton | 3.16 | 591 | 605 | 640 | 730 | 744 | 844 | 853 | 854 | | | | |
| Fine Gael | Michael Cleary | 2.84 | 531 | 532 | 553 | 574 | 604 | | | | | | | |
| Independent | Evelyn Nevin | 2.77 | 518 | 524 | 526 | 539 | | | | | | | | |
| Sinn Féin | Joan Delaney | 2.75 | 515 | 601 | 626 | 635 | 641 | 647 | | | | | | |
| Fine Gael | Maura Byrne | 2.50 | 467 | 483 | 520 | | | | | | | | | |
| Fine Gael | Michael Madden | 1.65 | 309 | 360 | | | | | | | | | | |
Electorate: 28,495 Valid: 18,712 (65.67%) Spoilt: 241 Quota: 1,872 Turnout: 18,953 (66.51%)

== Changes ==
=== Co-options ===
| Party | Outgoing | LEA | Reason | Date | Co-optee |
|---|---|---|---|---|---|
| Fianna Fáil | Jackie Cahill | Templemore-Thurles | Elected to the 32nd Dáil at the 2016 general election. | 14 March 2016 | Sean Ryan |
| Independent | Willie Kennedy | Templemore-Thurles | Death. | 11 April 2016 | Eddie Moran |
| Independent | Eddie O'Meara | Carrick-on-Suir | Death. | 10 September 2018 | Kevin O'Meara |
| Fine Gael | John Fahey | Carrick-on-Suir | Death. | 16 January 2019 | Mark Fitzgerald |

=== Changes in affiliation ===
| Name | LEA | Elected as | New affiliation | Date |
|---|---|---|---|---|
| Richie Molloy | Clonmel | Independent | Renua | 29 May 2015 |
| Kieran Bourke | Carrick-on-Suir | Independent | Fianna Fáil | 7 July 2016 |
| Richie Molloy | Clonmel | Renua | Independent | November 2017 |
| Seamus Morris | Nenagh | Sinn Féin | Independent | 9 November 2017 |
| David Doran | Templemore-Thurles | Sinn Féin | Independent | 24 January 2019 |
