= 2019 Tipperary County Council election =

Part of the 2019 Irish local elections

| ← 2014 | 24 May 2019 | 2024 → |

All 40 seats on Tipperary County Council 21 seats needed for a majority
| | First party | Second party | Third party |
|---|---|---|---|
| Party | Fine Gael | Fianna Fáil | Sinn Féin |
| Seats won | 12 | 9 | 2 |
| Seat change | ▲2 | ▼1 | ▼3 |
| | Fourth party | Fifth party | Sixth party |
| Party | Labour | Workers and Unemployed | Independent |
| Seats won | 1 | 1 | 15 |
| Seat change | Steady | Steady | ▲2 |
- Results by local electoral area

An election to all 40 seats on Tipperary County Council was held on 24 May 2019 as part of the 2019 Irish local elections. County Tipperary was divided into 8 local electoral areas (LEAs) to elect councillors for a five-year term of office on the electoral system of proportional representation by means of the single transferable vote (PR-STV).

== Boundary review ==
Following the recommendations of the 2018 LEA boundary review committee, there were significant change to the LEAs in use, as three of the five in place at the 2014 Tipperary County Council election exceeded the new maximum of 7 councillors. Other changes reflected population shifts revealed by the 2016 census.

== Results by party ==
| Party | Seats | ± | 1st pref | FPv% | ±% |
|---|---|---|---|---|---|
| Fine Gael | 12 | ▲2 | 20,208 | 27.07 | ▲1.04 |
| Fianna Fáil | 9 | ▼1 | 19,527 | 26.16 | ▲2.48 |
| Sinn Féin | 2 | ▼3 | 4,711 | 6.31 | ▼3.66 |
| Labour | 1 | Steady | 3,817 | 5.11 | ▼2.84 |
| Workers and Unemployed | 1 | Steady | 2,621 | 3.51 | ▲0.95 |
| Green | 0 | Steady | 446 | 0.60 | New |
| Aontú | 0 | Steady | 262 | 0.35 | New |
| Independent | 15 | ▲2 | 23,064 | 30.89 | ▲1.41 |
| Total | 40 | Steady | 74,656 | 100.00 | |

== Results by local electoral area ==
*: Outgoing councillor elected in 2014.
†: Outgoing councillor coopted subsequent to the 2014 election.

=== Cahir ===
Cahir: 4 seats
| Party | Candidate | FPv% | Count | | | |
| Party | Candidate | FPv% | 1 | 2 | 3 | 4 |
|---|---|---|---|---|---|---|
| Independent | Andy Moloney | 27.65% | 1,885 | | | |
| Fine Gael | Marie Murphy | 17.98% | 1,226 | 1,346 | 1,385 | |
| Independent | Máirín McGrath | 17.13% | 1,168 | 1,328 | 1,400 | |
| Fianna Fáil | Micheál Jnr Anglim | 15.49% | 1,056 | 1,124 | 1,204 | 1,509 |
| Independent | Martin Lonergan | 9.33% | 636 | 703 | 762 | 910 |
| Fianna Fáil | P.J. English | 7.82% | 533 | 581 | 638 | |
| Fianna Fáil | Anita Lonergan | 2.77% | 189 | 233 | | |
| Sinn Féin | Danny Carroll | 1.82% | 124 | 137 | | |
Electorate: 11,826 Valid: 6,817 Spoilt: 88 Quota: 1,364 Turnout: 6,905 (58.39%)

=== Carrick-on-Suir ===
Carrick-on-Suir: 5 seats
| Party | Candidate | FPv% | Count | | | | | | | |
| Party | Candidate | FPv% | 1 | 2 | 3 | 4 | 5 | 6 | 7 | 8 |
|---|---|---|---|---|---|---|---|---|---|---|
| Fianna Fáil | Imelda Goldsboro | 20.93% | 1,980 | | | | | | | |
| Sinn Féin | David Dunne | 13.55% | 1,282 | 1,287 | 1,350 | 1,419 | 1,497 | 1,662 | | |
| Fine Gael | Mark Fitzgerald | 12.99% | 1,229 | 1,325 | 1,335 | 1,346 | 1,351 | 1,425 | 1,616 | |
| Independent | Kevin O'Meara | 12.44% | 1,177 | 1,256 | 1,273 | 1,281 | 1,322 | 1,344 | 1,546 | 1,562 |
| Fine Gael | Louise McLoughlin | 10.73% | 1,015 | 1,068 | 1,077 | 1,097 | 1,109 | 1,171 | 1,314 | 1,325 |
| Fianna Fáil | Kieran Bourke | 10.27% | 971 | 1,031 | 1,042 | 1,101 | 1,196 | 1,347 | 1,414 | 1,482 |
| Workers and Unemployed | Michael Cleere | 7.16% | 677 | 752 | 779 | 799 | 814 | 823 | | |
| Fine Gael | Margaret Croke | 4.35% | 411 | 414 | 414 | 441 | 525 | | | |
| Independent | Pierce O'Loughlin | 3.46% | 327 | 330 | 333 | 358 | | | | |
| Labour | Sarah Dunne | 2.72% | 257 | 259 | 262 | | | | | |
| Sinn Féin | Joanne Ivors | 1.40% | 132 | 159 | | | | | | |
Electorate: 16,382 Valid: 9,458 Spoilt: 146 Quota: 1,577 Turnout: 9,604 (58.63%)

=== Cashel–Tipperary ===
Cashel–Tipperary: 7 seats
| Party | Candidate | FPv% | Count | | | | | | | | |
| Party | Candidate | FPv% | 1 | 2 | 3 | 4 | 5 | 6 | 7 | 8 | 9 |
|---|---|---|---|---|---|---|---|---|---|---|---|
| Fine Gael | Michael Fitzgerald | 25.43% | 3,005 | | | | | | | | |
| Fianna Fáil | Roger Kennedy | 12.42% | 1,468 | 1,651 | | | | | | | |
| Fine Gael | Declan Burgess | 11.19% | 1,322 | 1,533 | | | | | | | |
| Fine Gael | Mary Hanna Hourigan | 10.79% | 1,275 | 1,623 | | | | | | | |
| Fine Gael | John Crosse | 8.51% | 1,006 | 1,326 | 1,381 | 1,471 | 1,498 | | | | |
| Sinn Féin | Tony Black | 6.13% | 724 | 780 | 787 | 791 | 792 | 815 | 898 | 955 | 1,353 |
| Fianna Fáil | Jacqui Finnan | 6.07% | 717 | 856 | 897 | 914 | 918 | 943 | 1,021 | 1,077 | 1,166 |
| Sinn Féin | Martin Browne | 5.60% | 662 | 717 | 741 | 745 | 760 | 766 | 792 | 818 | |
| Independent | Annemarie Ryan (Shiner) | 4.96% | 586 | 658 | 662 | 676 | 678 | 785 | 869 | 1,276 | 1,339 |
| Independent | Lisa McGrath | 3.94% | 465 | 504 | 513 | 517 | 519 | 569 | 649 | | |
| Labour | Robert O'Donnell | 3.23% | 382 | 455 | 461 | 469 | 472 | 486 | | | |
| Independent | Barry Walsh | 1.73% | 205 | 236 | 237 | 241 | 242 | | | | |
Electorate: 22,816 Valid: 11,817 Spoilt: 151 Quota: 1,478 Turnout: 11,968 (52.45%)

=== Clonmel ===
Clonmel: 6 seats
| Party | Candidate | FPv% | Count | | | | | | | |
| Party | Candidate | FPv% | 1 | 2 | 3 | 4 | 5 | 6 | 7 | 8 |
|---|---|---|---|---|---|---|---|---|---|---|
| Fine Gael | Michael Murphy | 22.57% | 2,102 | | | | | | | |
| Fianna Fáil | Siobhán Ambrose | 21.81% | 2,031 | | | | | | | |
| Workers and Unemployed | Pat English | 17.17% | 1,599 | | | | | | | |
| Independent | Richie Molloy | 8.93% | 832 | 1,004 | 1,188 | 1,238 | 1,266 | 1,334 | | |
| Fine Gael | Garret Ahearn (Note: See change below.) | 8.76% | 816 | 1,222 | 1,356 | | | | | |
| Independent | Niall P. Dennehy | 5.48% | 510 | 581 | 659 | 689 | 705 | 760 | 882 | 1,065 |
| Sinn Féin | Catherine Carey | 5.35% | 498 | 531 | 590 | 624 | 645 | 709 | 738 | 898 |
| Workers and Unemployed | Teresa Johnson | 3.70% | 345 | 376 | 417 | 548 | 575 | 622 | 653 | |
| Aontú | Martin Duggan | 2.81% | 262 | 280 | 295 | 306 | 317 | | | |
| Fianna Fáil | David Shanahan | 2.09% | 195 | 227 | 404 | 409 | 419 | 433 | | |
| Independent | Eoin O'Flaherty | 1.33% | 124 | 132 | 144 | 151 | | | | |
Electorate: 18,681 Valid: 9,314 Spoilt: 182 Quota: 1,331 Turnout: 9,496 (50.83%)

=== Nenagh ===
Nenagh: 5 seats
| Party | Candidate | FPv% | Count | | | | | | |
| Party | Candidate | FPv% | 1 | 2 | 3 | 4 | 5 | 6 | 7 |
|---|---|---|---|---|---|---|---|---|---|
| Independent | Joe Hannigan | 20.23% | 2,113 | | | | | | |
| Independent | Michael O'Meara | 15.71% | 1,641 | 1,727 | 1,747 | | | | |
| Fine Gael | Gerard Darcy | 12.47% | 1,303 | 1,380 | 1,509 | 1,536 | 1,593 | 1,989 | |
| Independent | Séamus Morris | 10.24% | 1,070 | 1,108 | 1,151 | 1,293 | 1,408 | 1,592 | 1,675 |
| Labour | Louise Morgan Walsh | 10.07% | 1,052 | 1,085 | 1,129 | 1,225 | 1,330 | 1,411 | 1,461 |
| Independent | Hughie McGrath | 9.82% | 1,026 | 1,060 | 1,122 | 1,199 | 1,330 | 1,441 | 1,516 |
| Fianna Fáil | Damien Hough | 8.57% | 895 | 959 | 967 | 984 | 1,130 | | |
| Fianna Fáil | Brendan Murphy | 4.71% | 492 | 513 | 538 | 617 | | | |
| Sinn Féin | Damian O'Donoghue | 4.71% | 492 | 500 | 518 | | | | |
| Fine Gael | Conor Delaney | 3.02% | 315 | 322 | | | | | |
| Independent | Graham King | 0.44% | 46 | 48 | | | | | |
Electorate: 17,823 Valid: 10,445 Spoilt: 119 Quota: 1,741 Turnout: 10,564 (59.27%)

=== Newport ===
Newport: 4 seats
| Party | Candidate | FPv% | Count | | |
| Party | Candidate | FPv% | 1 | 2 | 3 |
|---|---|---|---|---|---|
| Labour | Fiona Bonfield | 26.37% | 2,126 | | |
| Independent | John 'Rocky' McGrath | 18.58% | 1,498 | 1,695 | |
| Fine Gael | Dr. Phyll Bugler | 16.77% | 1,352 | 1,475 | 1,722 |
| Fianna Fáil | John Carroll | 16.30% | 1,314 | 1,383 | 1,471 |
| Fianna Fáil | Mattie Ryan (Coole) | 14.52% | 1,171 | 1,222 | 1,270 |
| Green | Rose Anne White | 5.53% | 446 | 497 | |
| Sinn Féin | Teresa Collins | 1.92% | 155 | 177 | |
Electorate: 13,435 Valid: 8,062 Spoilt: 79 Quota: 1,613 Turnout: 8,141 (60.6%)

=== Roscrea–Templemore ===
Roscrea–Templemore: 4 seats
| Party | Candidate | FPv% | Count | | | | | |
| Party | Candidate | FPv% | 1 | 2 | 3 | 4 | 5 | 6 |
|---|---|---|---|---|---|---|---|---|
| Fianna Fáil | Michael Smith | 28.79% | 2,570 | | | | | |
| Fine Gael | Noel J. Coonan | 18.14% | 1,619 | 1,805 | | | | |
| Independent | Shane Lee | 15.87% | 1,417 | 1,586 | 1,592 | 1,713 | 1,897 | |
| Independent | Eddie Moran | 14.80% | 1,321 | 1,399 | 1,404 | 1,441 | 1,495 | 1,771 |
| Fine Gael | Jonathan Cullen | 7.46% | 666 | 686 | 688 | 710 | 745 | |
| Fianna Fáil | William Bergin | 6.97% | 622 | 822 | 826 | 846 | 925 | 1,219 |
| Sinn Féin | Michael 'Chinny' Donovan | 4.20% | 375 | 431 | 432 | 568 | | |
| Independent | Tommy Murphy | 3.78% | 337 | 412 | 413 | | | |
Electorate: 14,584 Valid: 8,927 Spoilt: 130 Quota: 1,786 Turnout: 9,057 (62.1%)

=== Thurles ===
Thurles: 5 seats
| Party | Candidate | FPv% | Count | | | | | | |
| Party | Candidate | FPv% | 1 | 2 | 3 | 4 | 5 | 6 | 7 |
|---|---|---|---|---|---|---|---|---|---|
| Independent | Micheál Lowry | 17.42% | 1,710 | | | | | | |
| Fianna Fáil | Seamus Hanafin | 15.87% | 1,558 | 1,570 | 1,596 | 1,620 | 1,896 | | |
| Fine Gael | Peter Ryan | 15.75% | 1,546 | 1,566 | 1,596 | 1,620 | 1,920 | | |
| Independent | Jim Ryan | 13.54% | 1,329 | 1,341 | 1,381 | 1,434 | 1,568 | 1,619 | 1,683 |
| Fianna Fáil | Sean Ryan | 12.02% | 1,180 | 1,188 | 1,200 | 1,231 | 1,327 | 1,419 | 1,547 |
| Independent | David Doran | 11.11% | 1,091 | 1,101 | 1,132 | 1,191 | 1,319 | 1,366 | 1,392 |
| Fianna Fáil | Fergal Butler | 5.96% | 585 | 589 | 595 | 601 | | | |
| Independent | Tommy Barrett | 3.47% | 341 | 344 | 372 | 403 | | | |
| Sinn Féin | Ciara McCormack | 2.72% | 267 | 269 | 282 | | | | |
| Independent | Catherine Fogarty | 1.20% | 118 | 119 | | | | | |
| Independent | Michael Bracken | 0.93% | 91 | 92 | | | | | |
Electorate: 16,447 Valid: 9,816 Spoilt: 107 Quota: 1,637 Turnout: 9,923 (60.33%)

== Results by gender ==
2019 Tipperary County Council election Candidates by gender
| Gender | Number of candidates | % of candidates | Elected councillors | % of councillors |
|---|---|---|---|---|
| Men | 57 | 72.2% | 32 | 80.0% |
| Women | 22 | 27.8% | 8 | 20.0% |
| TOTAL | 79 | | 40 | |

== Changes after 2019 ==
=== Co-options ===
| Party | Outgoing | LEA | Reason | Date | Co-optee |
|---|---|---|---|---|---|
| Fine Gael | Garret Ahearn | Clonmel | Elected to the 26th Seanad at the 2020 Seanad election | 13 July 2020 | John Fitzgerald |

=== Changes in affiliation ===
| Name | LEA | Elected as | New affiliation | Date |
|---|---|---|---|---|
| Annemarie Ryan | Cashel–Tipperary | Independent | Sinn Féin | November 2023 |
