= Carrick-on-Suir Town Hall =

Municipal building in Carrick-on-Suir, County Tipperary, Ireland

- Halla an Bhaile Carraig na Siúire
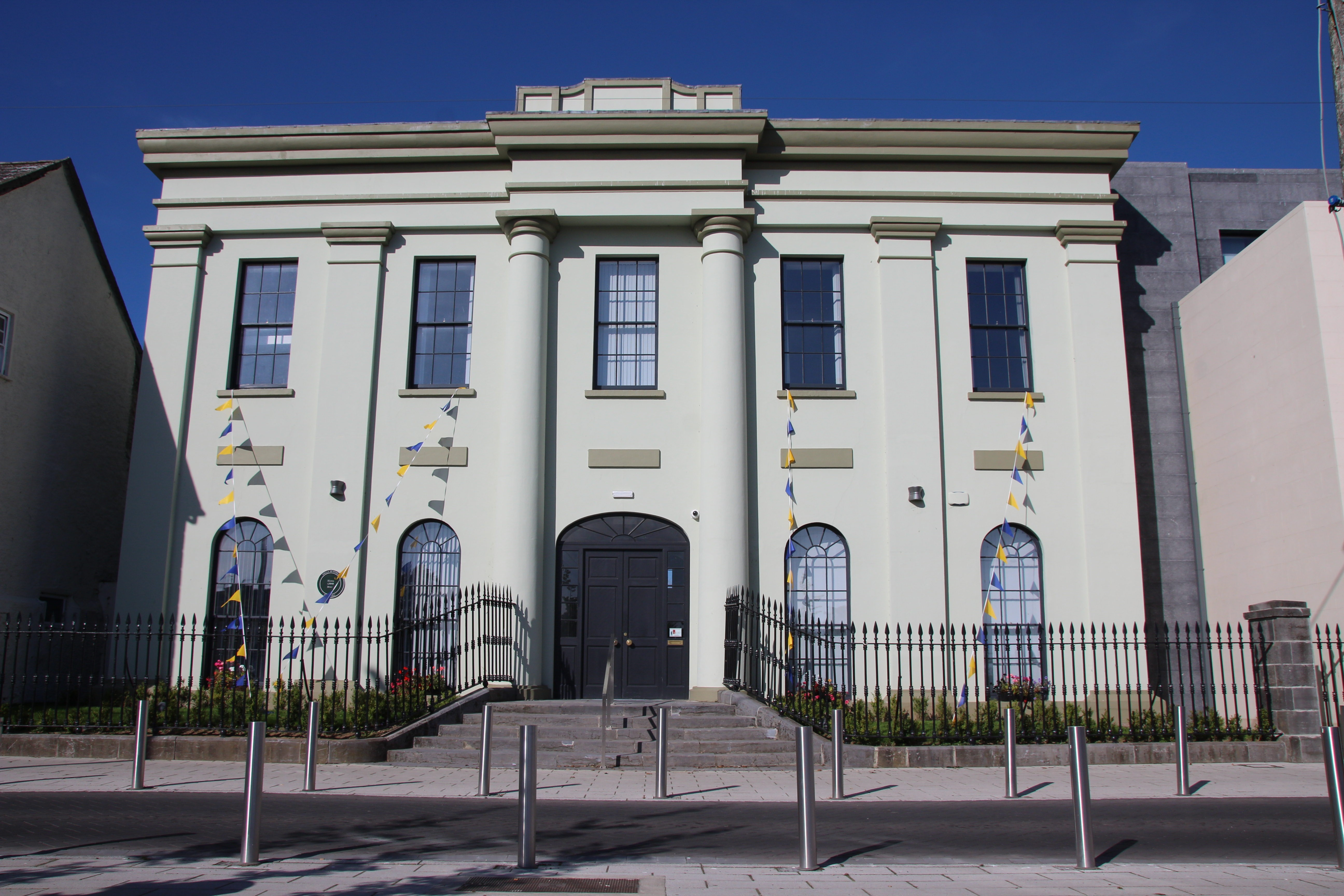
- Carrick-on-Suir Town Hall

- Location within Ireland

General information
- Architectural style: Neoclassical style
- Location: New Street, Carrick-on-Suir, Ireland
- Coordinates: 52.3458°N 7.4102°W
- Completed: 1844

Design and construction
- Architect: Thomas Anthony

Carrick-on-Suir Town Hall (Irish: Halla an Bhaile Carraig na Siúire) is a municipal building in New Street, Carrick-on-Suir, County Tipperary, Ireland. The building accommodated the offices of Carrick-on-Suir Town Council until 2014 but is now used by Tipperary County Council for the provision of services to local residents.

== History ==
The first municipal building in Carrick-on-Suir was a four-storey square tower in West Gate known as The Tholsel, which was completed in around 1500. An octagonal roof lantern was added in around 1750, and a clock was added in 1784.

The current building was commissioned as a mechanics' institute. It was financed by public subscription and the committee supervising the project was chaired by John Ponsonby, 4th Earl of Bessborough whose seat was at Bessborough House. It was designed by Thomas Anthony in the neoclassical style, built in brick with a cement render finish, and was completed in around 1844.

The design involved a symmetrical main frontage of five bays facing onto New Street. The central bay featured a short flight of steps leading up to a segmental headed doorway. The building was fenestrated by round headed windows in the other bays on the ground floor, and by sash windows with window sills on the first floor. There were rendered panels below the first-floor windows. The central bay was flanked by full-height Doric order columns and the outer bays were flanked by full-height Doric order pilasters all supporting an entablature, prominent eaves and a central moulded pediment.

Following the appointment of town commissioners in the mid-19th century, the building was converted into offices for their use in 1866. In 1899, the town commissioners were replaced by an urban district council, with the building becoming the offices of the new council. The building became an important venue for public meetings: the Irish nationalist, Constance Markievicz, gave a talk about the Easter Rising to a packed audience in the town hall in November 1917.

A limited refurbishment of the building was carried out in the 1970s. It continued to be used as the offices of the urban district council until 2002, and then as the offices of the successor town council. In 2014, the council was dissolved and administration of the town was amalgamated with Tipperary County Council in accordance with the Local Government Reform Act 2014.

A major programme of refurbishment works, which involved the construction of a new glazed entrance façade, to the north of the existing structure, as well as a new three-storey extension behind it, was carried out by Tom O'Brien Construction at a cost of €2.4 million, to a design by Deaton Lysaght Architects, and completed in March 2019. A new business hub was also included in the enlarged complex.
