= Martin Browne (politician) =

Irish politician (born 1965/1966)

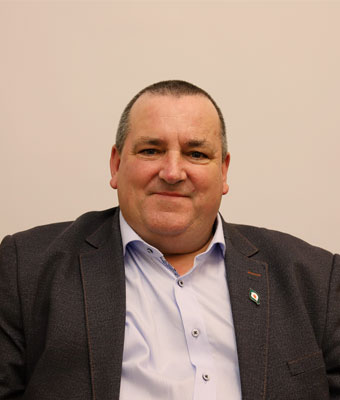
- Browne in 2020

Teachta Dála
- In office February 2020 – November 2024
- Constituency: Tipperary

Tipperary County Councillor
- In office 23 May 2014 – 24 May 2019
- Constituency: Cashel–Tipperary

Cashel Town Councillor
- In office 2011–2014
- Constituency: Cashel Town

Personal details
- Born: 1965/1966 (age 60–61)
- Party: Sinn Féin
- Spouse: Helen Browne
- Children: 4

Martin Browne (born 1965/1966) is an Irish former Sinn Féin politician who served as a Teachta Dála (TD) for the Tipperary constituency from 2020 to 2024. Browne was the Chairman of the Oireachtas Joint Committee on Public Petitions. A native of Cashel, he was elected as a member of Tipperary County Council in 2014 for the Cashel—Tipperary local electoral area, serving for 5 years before losing his seat.

== Political career ==
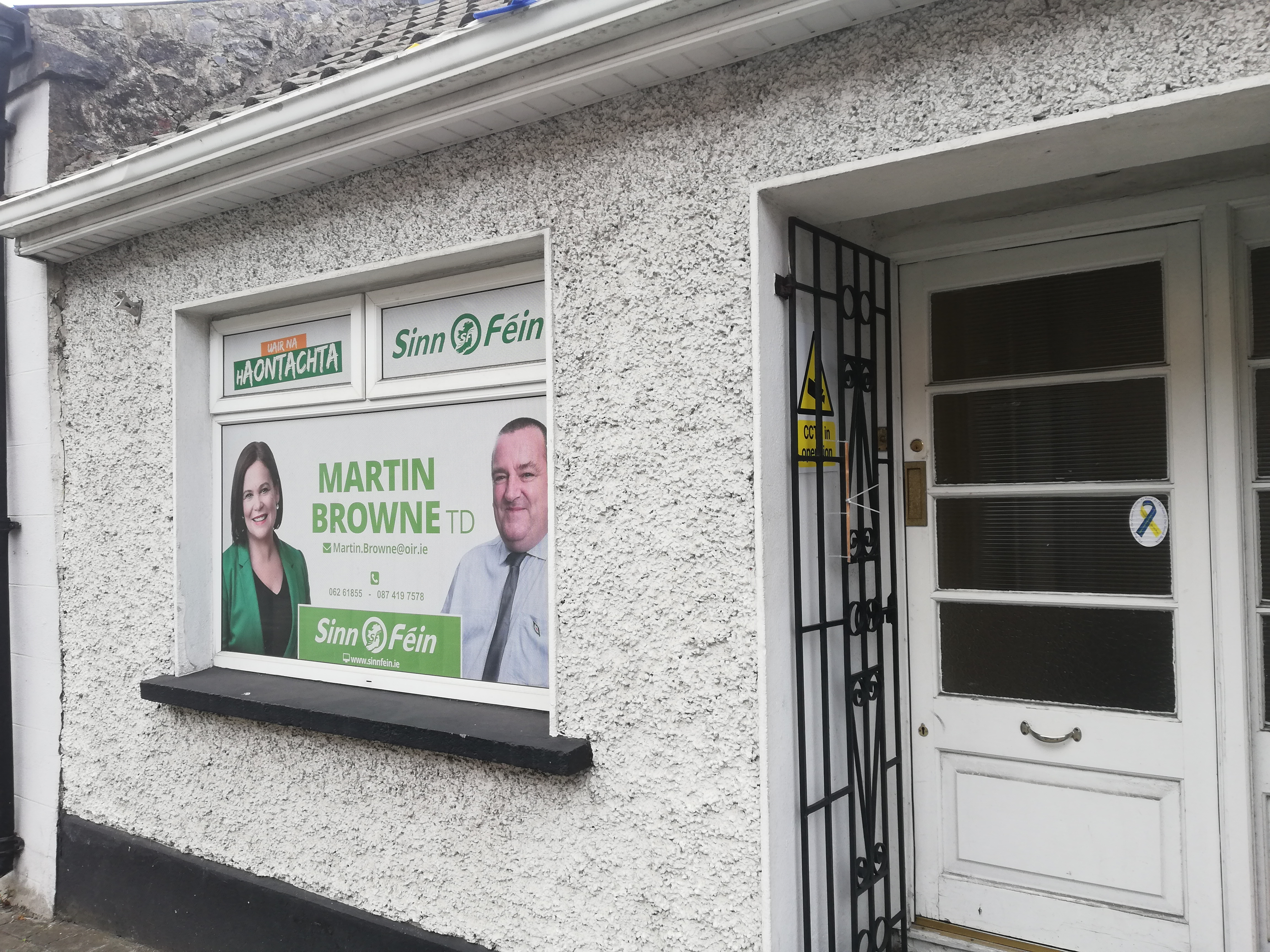
Constituency office, Cashel

Browne was first elected to a political position at the 2014 Tipperary County Council election, finishing in second place in the Cashel-Tipperary municipal district with 11% of the first preference vote. He lost that seat at the 2019 Tipperary council election, dropping to eighth place and losing his seat to another Sinn Féin candidate, Tony Black.

At the 2020 Irish general election Browne became a Teachta Dála for Tipperary in an election in which Sinn Féin performed much better than previously expected.

In December 2020, Browne received political backlash after social media posts made during his time as a county councillor received national attention. Browne has previously used his social media to share a conspiracy theory that the September 11 attacks had been staged using holograms, as well as sharing a post in which Fidel Castro compared NATO to the Nazi SS and accused the USA and Israel of "creating" ISIS and another post in which he questioned reports that Syrian president Bashar al-Assad had used chemical weapons on his own people. Browne issued an apology for the posts, saying he should never have shared them and that they "did not reflect his views".

In July 2021 Browne faced criticism after he refused to condemn the 1996 killing of Garda Detective Jerry McCabe by members of the Provisional IRA, despite the fact that Sinn Féin leader Mary Lou McDonald unequivocally condemned it days previously.

For the 2024 Irish general election the Tipperary constituency was split into Tipperary North and Tipperary South. Browne ran in Tipperary South but was unsuccessful, and lost his seat.

== Personal life ==
He is married to Helen Browne, and they have four children. His brother Michael was Mayor of Cashel, and met with Elizabeth II on her visit to Ireland in 2011.

Dáil	Election	Deputy (Party)	Deputy (Party)	Deputy (Party)	Deputy (Party)	Deputy (Party)	Deputy (Party)	Deputy (Party)
4th	1923	Dan Breen (Rep)	Séamus Burke (CnaG)	Louis Dalton (CnaG)	Daniel Morrissey (Lab)	Patrick Ryan (Rep)	Michael Heffernan (FP)	Seán McCurtin (CnaG)
5th	1927 (Jun)	Seán Hayes (FF)	Séamus Burke (CnaG)	John Hassett (CnaG)	Daniel Morrissey (Lab)	William O'Brien (Lab)	Michael Heffernan (FP)	Andrew Fogarty (FF)
6th	1927 (Sep)	Seán Hayes (FF)	Séamus Burke (CnaG)	John Hassett (CnaG)	Daniel Morrissey (Lab)	Timothy Sheehy (FF)	Michael Heffernan (FP)	Andrew Fogarty (FF)
7th	1932	Seán Hayes (FF)	Séamus Burke (CnaG)	John Hassett (CnaG)	Daniel Morrissey (Ind.)	Timothy Sheehy (FF)	Dan Breen (FF)	Andrew Fogarty (FF)
8th	1933	Seán Hayes (FF)	Séamus Burke (CnaG)	Richard Curran (NCP)	Daniel Morrissey (CnaG)	Martin Ryan (FF)	Dan Breen (FF)	Andrew Fogarty (FF)
9th	1937	William O'Brien (Lab)	Séamus Burke (FG)	Jeremiah Ryan (FG)	Daniel Morrissey (FG)	Martin Ryan (FF)	Dan Breen (FF)	Andrew Fogarty (FF)
10th	1938	Frank Loughman (FF)	Richard Curran (FG)	Jeremiah Ryan (FG)	Daniel Morrissey (FG)	Martin Ryan (FF)	Dan Breen (FF)	Andrew Fogarty (FF)
11th	1943	Richard Stapleton (Lab)	William O'Donnell (CnaT)	Jeremiah Ryan (FG)	Daniel Morrissey (FG)	Martin Ryan (FF)	Dan Breen (FF)	Andrew Fogarty (FF)
12th	1944	Frank Loughman (FF)	William O'Donnell (CnaT)	Richard Mulcahy (FG)	Daniel Morrissey (FG)	Mary Ryan (FF)	Dan Breen (FF)	Andrew Fogarty (FF)
12th	1947 by-election	Frank Loughman (FF)	Patrick Kinane (CnaP)	Richard Mulcahy (FG)	Daniel Morrissey (FG)	Mary Ryan (FF)	Dan Breen (FF)	Andrew Fogarty (FF)
13th	1948	Constituency abolished. See Tipperary North and Tipperary South						

Dáil	Election	Deputy (Party)	Deputy (Party)	Deputy (Party)	Deputy (Party)	Deputy (Party)
32nd	2016	Séamus Healy (WUA)	Alan Kelly (Lab)	Jackie Cahill (FF)	Michael Lowry (Ind.)	Mattie McGrath (Ind.)
33rd	2020	Martin Browne (SF)	Alan Kelly (Lab)	Jackie Cahill (FF)	Michael Lowry (Ind.)	Mattie McGrath (Ind.)
34th	2024	Constituency abolished. See Tipperary North and Tipperary South				
