= Dorothea Herbert =

Irish diarist and poet

- Known for: Diarist and poet
- Notable work: Retrospections
- Parent: Nicholas Herbert

Dorothea Herbert (c.1767–1829) was an Irish diarist and poet. Her Retrospections, (original title: Retrospections of an Outcast, or the Reflections of Dorothea Herbert written in Retirement) first published in two volumes in 1929-30, contains an account of life in late eighteenth century Carrick-on-Suir, County Tipperary, Ireland, where her father was rector, but her witty observations and social insights were soon overshadowed by her unrequited passion for John Roe, heir to Rockwell near Knockgrafton, another of her father's parishes. Retrospections provides historians with a valuable insight into eighteenth-century life in provincial Ireland.

== Life ==
Herbert was the eldest (of nine children) of Rev. Nicholas Herbert, Church of Ireland rector of Carrick-on-Suir, County Tipperary. Her mother, Martha, was the daughter of John Cuffe, Lord Desart. Her education was as a day-pupil at a boarding-school in Carrick. Private tutors were engaged to teach her dancing, French and music.

Initially, Dorothea enjoyed the genteel social life of the town (although privately she regarded its manners as "amusingly vulgar and uncivilised"). She rejected an offer of marriage from her father's curate, John Gwynne (despite the fact that she found him goodnatured and amusing) at her mother's insistence.

While residing in Carrick, Rev. Herbert benefited from the livings of three other parishes, with curates undertaking the church duties at each. In 1788, however, the diocese directed him to spend more attention to Knockgrafton, a parish some twenty miles from Carrick. Rev. Herbert built a house there and visited annually. There, Dorothea encountered John Roe, the "mysterious, moody and attractive" son of a local landowner. She became infatuated with Roe but this was not requited: over six annual visits she came to understand that, at best, Roe accepted her as no more than a harmless dalliance.

The "betrayal" (as Dorothea believed) by Roe caused her to withdraw from society and she fell into a solitary existence. She was barred from attending church because of her "profane conduct". By 1798, when (as Herbert relates it) her "foster-mother" was murdered by rebels in the "Whiteboys" anti-landlord uprising, she had already suffered a nervous breakdown. (Note: Finnegan explains that the "foster-mother" was in fact her former wet nurse, Anastacia Shortis, whom she continued to hold in great affection. Anastacia was the wife of Rev. Herbert's tithe collector, who was also killed.) This outrage was followed first by the death of her brother, Otway, and then that of her father.

The Herberts continued to live in Carrick following the death of Rev. Nicholas Herbert, but thereafter Dorothea's life diminished into that of a "melancholic, hysterical spinster".

== Works ==
In spite of increasing isolation, depression and derangement Dorothea wrote plays, novels and an opera, none of which can be accounted for. However her Poetical Eccentricities Written by an Oddity, a volume of poetry, has survived. It, along with her Journal Notes (a continuation of her Retrospections), has been published as a biography by historian Dr. Frances Finnegan.
