= Imelda Goldsboro =

Irish politician

Senator Imelda Goldsboro
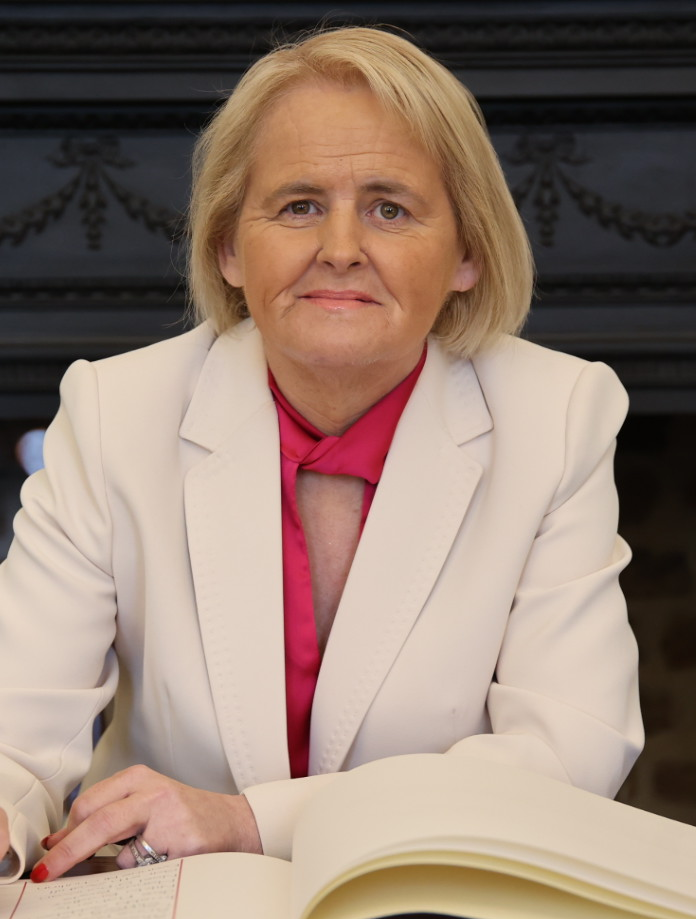
- Goldsboro in 2025

Senator
- Incumbent
- Assumed office 7 February 2025
- Constituency: Nominated by the Taoiseach

Tipperary County Councillor
- In office 2014–2025
- Constituency: Carrick-on-Suir

Personal details
- Party: Fianna Fáil

Imelda Goldsboro is an Irish Fianna Fáil politician who has been a senator since February 2025 after being nominated by the Taoiseach.

== Political career ==
Goldsboro was an unsuccessful candidate for the Tipperary constituency at the 2020 general election, and was also unsuccessful for the Tipperary South constituency at the 2024 general election. She also unsuccessfully contested the Agricultural Panel at the 2025 Seanad election. She was a member of Tipperary County Council for the Carrick-on-Suir area from May 2014 to February 2025, and sat on its South East Regional Drug and Alcohol Task Force committee.
