= Tipperary County Council =

Local authority of County Tipperary, Ireland

Tipperary County Council Comhairle Contae Thiobraid Árann

Type
- Type: County council of County Tipperary

History
- Founded: 1 June 2014

Leadership
- Cathaoirleach: Fiona Bonfield, Lab

Structure
- Seats: 40
- Political groups: Fianna Fáil (10) Fine Gael (10) Labour (3) Sinn Féin (2) Workers and Unemployed (1) Independent (14)

Elections
- Last election: 7 June 2024

Meeting place
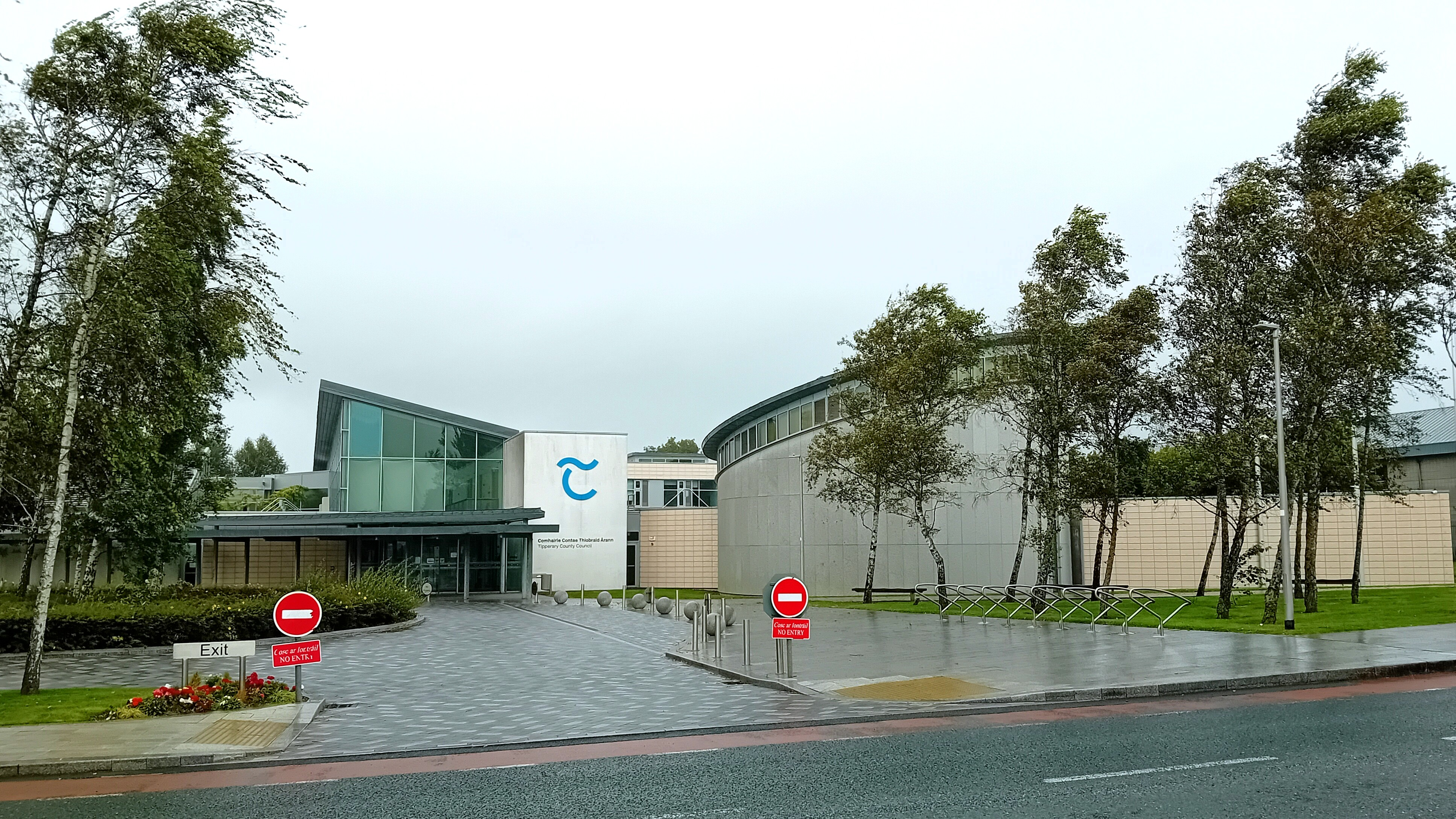
- Civic Offices, Nenagh (pictured); and; Civic Offices, Clonmel

Website
- Official website

The area governed by the council

Tipperary County Council (Irish: Comhairle Contae Thiobraid Árann) is the local authority of County Tipperary, Ireland. As a county council, it is governed by the Local Government Act 2001. The council is responsible for housing and community, roads and transportation, urban planning and development, amenity and culture, and environment. The council has 40 elected members. Elections are held every five years and are by single transferable vote. The head of the council has the title of Cathaoirleach (chairperson). The county administration is headed by a chief executive, Joe MacGrath. The administrative centres are Nenagh and Clonmel.

== Establishment ==
Tipperary County Council was established on 1 June 2014 and came into operation after the 2014 local elections, as a successor to North Tipperary County Council and South Tipperary County Council under the provisions of the Local Government Reform Act 2014. On the same date, the town councils of Carrick-on-Suir, Cashel, Nenagh, Templemore, Tipperary and Thurles and the borough council of Clonmel were dissolved and their functions were transferred to Tipperary County Council. The council has 40 members. This is a reduction from the combined total of its predecessor councils (21 in North Tipperary and 26 in South Tipperary).

== Regional Assembly ==
Tipperary County Council has three representatives on the Southern Regional Assembly who are part of the Mid-West Strategic Planning Area Committee.

== Elections ==
Members of Tipperary County Council are elected for a five-year term of office on the electoral system of proportional representation by means of the single transferable vote (PR-STV) from multi-member local electoral areas (LEAs).

Year	FG	FF	SF	Lab	WUA	Ind.	Total
2024	10	10	2	3	1	14	40
2019	12	9	2	1	1	15	40
2014	10	10	5	1	1	13	40

== Local electoral areas and municipal districts ==
County Tipperary is divided into LEAs, defined by electoral divisions, and into borough and municipal districts for the purposes of local exercising of the powers of the local authority. The municipal district which contains the administrative area of the former borough of Clonmel is referred to as a Borough District.

Municipal District	LEA	Definition	Seats
Borough District of Clonmel	Clonmel	Ballyclerahan, Clonmel East Urban, Clonmel Rural, Clonmel West Urban, Colman, Graigue (in the former Rural District of Cashel), Inishlounaght, Kilcash, Killaloan, Kilsheelan, Kiltinan, Lisronagh and Tullamain.	6
Tipperary–Cahir–Cashel	Cahir	Ardfinnan, Ballybacon, Ballyporeen, Burncourt, Caher, Clogheen, Coolagarranroe, Derrygrath, Kilcommon, Kilcoran, Killadriffe, Knockgraffon, Mortlestown, Newcastle, Tubbrid, Tullaghmelan and Tullaghorton	4
Tipperary–Cahir–Cashel	Cashel–Tipperary	Ardmayle, Ballycarron, Ballygriffin, Ballykisteen, Bansha, Bruis, Cappagh, Cashel Rural, Cashel Urban, Clonbeg, Clonoulty East, Clonoulty West, Cullen, Curraheen, Donohill, Drumwood, Emly, Glengar, Golden, Kilfeakle, Killeenasteena, Kilmucklin, Kilpatrick, Lattin, Nodstown, Oughterleague, Rathlynin, Rodus, Shronell, Solloghodbeg, Templeneiry, Thomastown, Tipperary East Urban, Tipperary Rural and Tipperary West Urban.	7
Carrick-on-Suir		Anner, Ardsallagh, Ballingarry (in the former Rural District of Slieveardagh), Ballyphilip, Ballysheehan, Carrickbeg Urban, Carrick-on-Suir Rural, Carrick-on-Suir Urban, Cloneen, Cooleagh, Crohane, Drangan, Farranrory, Fethard, Garrangibbon, Graystown, Killenaule, Kilmurry, Kilvemnon, Magorban, Modeshil, Mullinahone, New Birmingham, Newtown, Peppardstown and Poyntstown.	5
Nenagh	Nenagh	Aglishcloghane, Ardcrony, Ballingarry (in the former Rural District of Borrisokane), Ballygibbon, Ballylusky, Ballymackey, Borrisokane, Carrig, Cloghjordan, Cloghprior, Clohaskin, Finnoe, Graigue (in the former Rural District of Borrisokane), Kilbarron, Knigh, Lorrha East, Lorrha West, Mertonhall, Monsea, Nenagh East Urban, Nenagh Rural, Nenagh West Urban, Rathcabban, Redwood, Riverstown, Terryglass and Uskane.	5
Nenagh	Newport	Abington, Ballina, Ballynaclogh, Birdhill, Burgesbeg, Carrigatogher, Castletown, Derrycastle, Dolla, Foilnaman, Greenhall, Kilcomenty, Kilkeary, Killoscully, Kilmore, Kilnaneave, Kilnarath, Lackagh, Newport, Templederry and Youghalarra.	4
Thurles	Thurles	Ballycahill, Ballymurreen, Buolick, Clogher, Fennor, Gaile, Gortkelly, Holycross, Inch, Kilcooly, Kilrush, Littleton, Longfordpass, Moyaliff, Moycarky, Rahelty, Thurles Rural, Thurles Urban, Two-Mile-Borris and Upperchurch.	5
Thurles	Roscrea–Templemore	Aghnameadle, Borrisnafarney, Borrisnoe, Borrisoleigh, Bourney East, Bourney West, Drom, Glenkeen, Killavinoge, Killea, Latteragh, Loughmore, Moyne, Rathnaveoge, Roscrea, Templemore, Templetouhy and Timoney.	4

== Councillors ==
The following were elected at the 2024 Tipperary County Council election.

=== 2024 seats summary ===
Party	Seats
Fianna Fáil	10
Fine Gael	10
Labour	3
Sinn Féin	2
Workers and Unemployed	1
Independent	14

=== Councillors by electoral area ===
This list reflects the order in which councillors were elected on 7 June 2024.

Council members from 2024 election
Local electoral area	Name	Party
Cahir	Máirín McGrath	Independent
Cahir	Andy Moloney	Independent
Cahir	Marie Murphy	Fine Gael
Cahir	Micheál Anglim	Fianna Fáil
Carrick-on-Suir	Imelda Goldsboro (Note: Replaced during term, see table below for details.)	Fianna Fáil
Carrick-on-Suir	David Dunne	Sinn Féin
Carrick-on-Suir	Michael Brennan	Labour
Carrick-on-Suir	Kieran Bourke	Fianna Fáil
Carrick-on-Suir	Mark Fitzgerald	Fine Gael
Cashel–Tipperary	John O'Heney	Independent
Cashel–Tipperary	Declan Burgess	Fine Gael
Cashel–Tipperary	Liam Browne	Independent
Cashel–Tipperary	Roger Kennedy	Fianna Fáil
Cashel–Tipperary	Mary Hanna Hourigan	Fine Gael
Cashel–Tipperary	John Crosse	Fine Gael
Cashel–Tipperary	Annemarie Ryan	Sinn Féin
Clonmel	Michael Murphy	Fine Gael
Clonmel	Pat English	Workers and Unemployed
Clonmel	Siobhán Ambrose	Fianna Fáil
Clonmel	John FitzGerald	Fine Gael
Clonmel	Richie Molloy	Independent
Clonmel	Niall Dennehy	Independent
Nenagh	Joe Hannigan	Independent
Nenagh	Michael O'Meara	Independent
Nenagh	Ryan O'Meara	Fianna Fáil
Nenagh	Séamus Morris	Independent
Nenagh	Louise Morgan Walsh	Labour
Newport	Fiona Bonfield	Labour
Newport	Pamela Quirke O'Meara	Independent
Newport	Phyll Bugler	Fine Gael
Newport	John Carroll	Fianna Fáil
Roscrea–Templemore	Michael Smith	Fianna Fáil
Roscrea–Templemore	Shane Lee	Independent
Roscrea–Templemore	Eddie Moran	Independent
Roscrea–Templemore	William Kennedy	Fine Gael
Thurles	Jim Ryan	Independent
Thurles	Micheál Lowry	Independent
Thurles	Seán Ryan	Fianna Fáil
Thurles	Kay Cahill Skehan	Fianna Fáil
Thurles	Peggy Ryan	Fine Gael

==== Co-options ====
Party	Outgoing	LEA	Reason	Date	Co-optee
Fianna Fáil	Ryan O'Meara	Nenagh	Elected to the 34th Dáil at the 2024 general election	19 December 2024	JP O'Meara
Fine Gael	Michael Murphy	Clonmel	Elected to the 34th Dáil at the 2024 general election	19 December 2024	Tom Acheson
Fianna Fáil	Imelda Goldsboro	Carrick-on-Suir	Nominated to the 27th Seanad	10 March 2025	Amy Goldsboro
