= Michael Murphy (Fine Gael politician) =

Irish politician

Michael Murphy TD
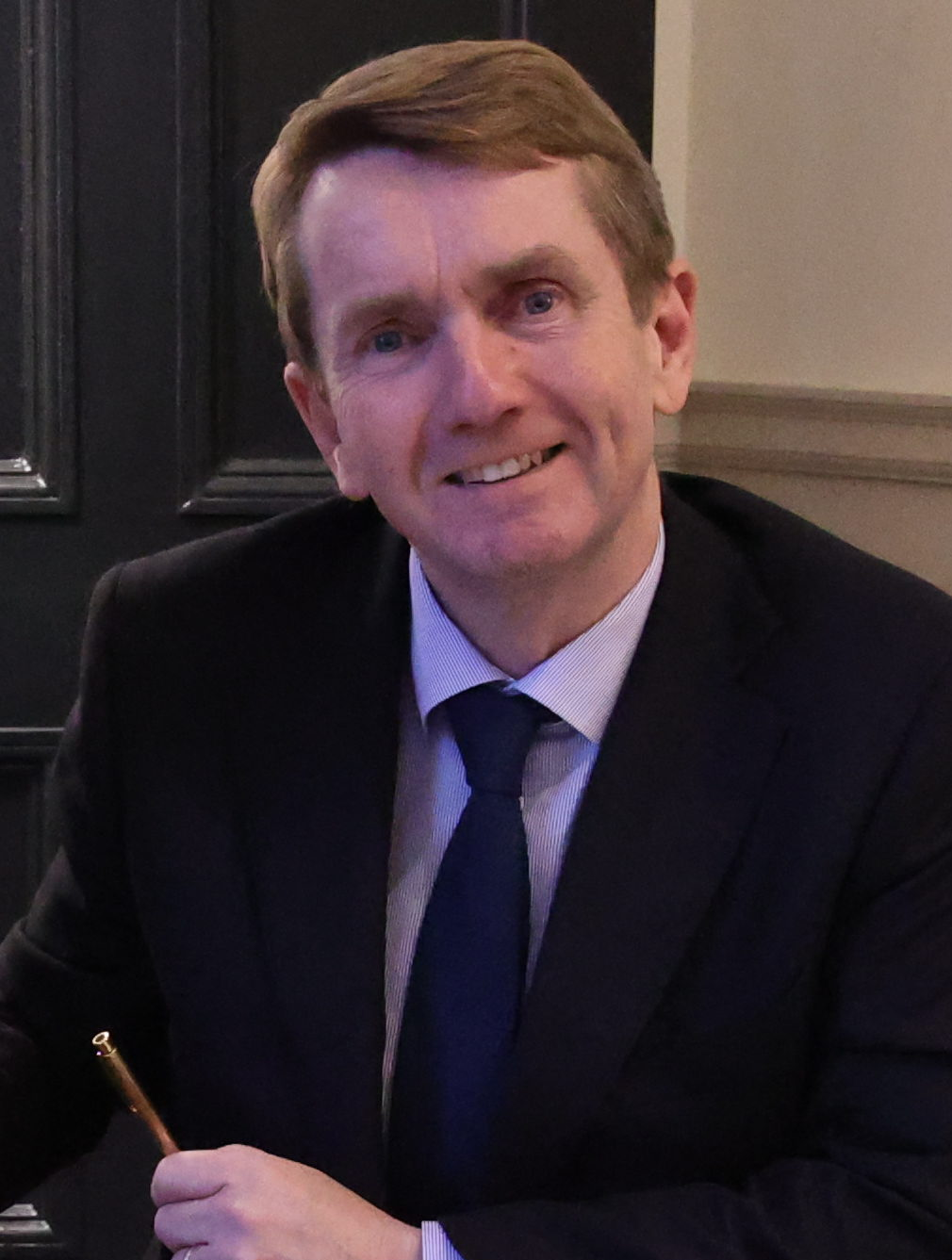
- Murphy in 2024

Chair of the Joint Oireachtas Committee on Transport
- Incumbent
- Assumed office 24 April 2025
- Preceded by: Alan Farrell

Teachta Dála
- Incumbent
- Assumed office November 2024
- Constituency: Tipperary South

Tipperary County Councillor
- In office 2014–2024
- Constituency: Clonmel

South Tipperary County Councillor
- In office 2009–2014
- Constituency: Clonmel

Personal details
- Party: Fine Gael
- Spouse: Jacinta Murphy
- Children: 1

Michael Murphy is an Irish Fine Gael politician who has been a Teachta Dála (TD) for the Tipperary South constituency since the 2024 general election.

He was elected to South Tipperary County Council in 2009, was a member of Tipperary County Council from 2014 to 2024. He was an unsuccessful candidate at the 2011 general election for Tipperary South.

In April 2025 he was nominated by Tánaiste Simon Harris as chair of the Joint Oireachtas Committee on Transport.

Dáil	Election	Deputy (Party)	Deputy (Party)	Deputy (Party)	Deputy (Party)
13th	1948	Michael Davern (FF)	Richard Mulcahy (FG)	Dan Breen (FF)	John Timoney (CnaP)
14th	1951	Michael Davern (FF)	Richard Mulcahy (FG)	Dan Breen (FF)	Patrick Crowe (FG)
15th	1954	Michael Davern (FF)	Richard Mulcahy (FG)	Dan Breen (FF)	Patrick Crowe (FG)
16th	1957	Michael Davern (FF)	Richard Mulcahy (FG)	Dan Breen (FF)	Frank Loughman (FF)
17th	1961	Michael Davern (FF)	Patrick Hogan (FG)	Dan Breen (FF)	Seán Treacy (Note: Treacy served as Ceann Comhairle in the 20th Dáil from 1973 to 1977, and was returned automatically at the 1977 election. He lost the Labour party whip in February 1985.) (Lab)
18th	1965	Don Davern (FF)	Patrick Hogan (FG)	Jackie Fahey (FF)	Seán Treacy (Lab)
19th	1969	Noel Davern (FF)	Patrick Hogan (FG)	Jackie Fahey (FF)	Seán Treacy (Lab)
20th	1973	Noel Davern (FF)	Brendan Griffin (FG)	Jackie Fahey (FF)	Seán Treacy (Lab)
21st	1977	Noel Davern (FF)	Brendan Griffin (FG)	3 seats 1977–1981	Seán Treacy (Lab)
22nd	1981	Carrie Acheson (FF)	Brendan Griffin (FG)	Seán McCarthy (FF)	Seán Treacy (Lab)
23rd	1982 (Feb)	Seán Byrne (FF)	Brendan Griffin (FG)	Seán McCarthy (FF)	Seán Treacy (Lab)
24th	1982 (Nov)	Seán Byrne (FF)	Brendan Griffin (FG)	Seán McCarthy (FF)	Seán Treacy (Lab)
25th	1987	Noel Davern (FF)	Brendan Griffin (FG)	Seán McCarthy (FF)	Seán Treacy (Note: Treacy served as Ceann Comhairle in the 25th, 26th and 27th Dáil from 1987 to 1997, and was returned automatically at the 1989 and 1992 elections.) (Ind.)
26th	1989	Noel Davern (FF)	Theresa Ahearn (FG)	Michael Ferris (Lab)	Seán Treacy (Ind.)
27th	1992	Noel Davern (FF)	Theresa Ahearn (FG)	Michael Ferris (Lab)	Seán Treacy (Ind.)
28th	1997	Noel Davern (FF)	Theresa Ahearn (FG)	Michael Ferris (Lab)	3 seats from 1997
28th	2000 by-election	Noel Davern (FF)	Theresa Ahearn (FG)	Séamus Healy (Ind.)	3 seats from 1997
28th	2001 by-election	Noel Davern (FF)	Tom Hayes (FG)	Séamus Healy (Ind.)	3 seats from 1997
29th	2002	Noel Davern (FF)	Tom Hayes (FG)	Séamus Healy (Ind.)	3 seats from 1997
30th	2007	Mattie McGrath (FF)	Tom Hayes (FG)	Martin Mansergh (FF)	3 seats from 1997
31st	2011	Mattie McGrath (Ind.)	Tom Hayes (FG)	Séamus Healy (WUA)	3 seats from 1997
32nd	2016	Constituency abolished. See Tipperary			

Dáil	Election	Deputy (Party)	Deputy (Party)	Deputy (Party)
34th	2024	Mattie McGrath (Ind.)	Michael Murphy (FG)	Séamus Healy (Ind.)
