= Carrick-on-Suir =

Town in County Tipperary, Ireland

Carrick-on-Suir Carraig na Siúire
- Town
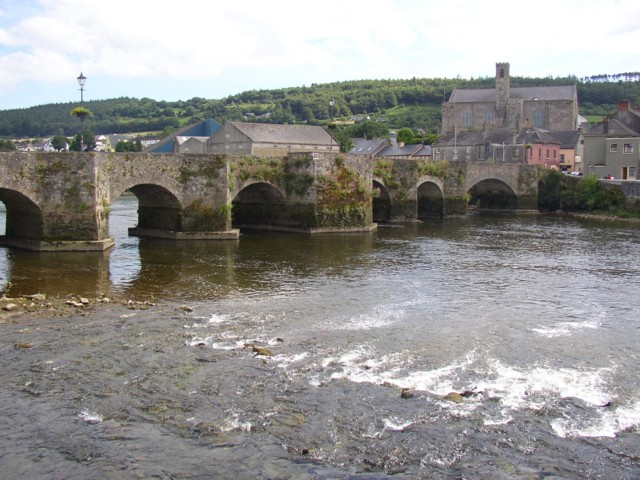
- The old bridge, Carrick on Suir

- Location in Ireland
- Coordinates: 52.346509°N 7.411995°W
- Country: Ireland
- Province: Munster
- County: County Tipperary

Area
  - Total: 3.2 km^{2} (1.2 sq mi)
- Elevation: 10 m (33 ft)

Population (2022)
  - Total: 5,752
  - Density: 1,800/km^{2} (4,700/sq mi)
- Time zone: UTC0 (WET)
  - Summer (DST): UTC+1 (IST)
- Eircode: E32
- Area code: 051
- Irish Grid Reference: S398218

Carrick-on-Suir (Irish: Carraig na Siúire, meaning 'rock of the Suir') is a town in County Tipperary, Ireland. It lies on both banks of the River Suir. The part on the north bank of the Suir lies in the civil parish of "Carrick", in the historical barony of Iffa and Offa East. The part on the south bank lies in the civil parish of Kilmolerin in the barony of Upperthird, County Waterford.

Historical population
Year	Pop.	±%
1821	7,466	—
1831	9,226	+23.6%
1841	11,049	+19.8%
1851	8,319	−24.7%
1861	6,536	−21.4%
1871	7,792	+19.2%
1881	6,583	−15.5%
1891	5,608	−14.8%
1901	5,406	−3.6%
1911	5,235	−3.2%
1926	4,657	−11.0%
1936	4,840	+3.9%
1946	4,859	+0.4%
1951	4,757	−2.1%
1956	4,727	−0.6%
1961	4,672	−1.2%
1966	4,874	+4.3%
1971	5,006	+2.7%
1981	5,566	+11.2%
1986	5,353	−3.8%
1991	5,143	−3.9%
1996	5,217	+1.4%
2002	5,586	+7.1%
2006	5,906	+5.7%
2011	5,931	+0.4%
2016	5,771	−2.7%

== Location ==
Carrick-on-Suir is situated in the south-eastern corner of County Tipperary, 21 km (13 mi) east of Clonmel and 27 km (17 mi) northwest of Waterford. Most of the town lies north of the river in the townland of Carrig Mór ('big rock'), with the remainder of the town on the opposite bank in the townland of Carrig Beag ('small rock'). The town is connected to Limerick and Waterford by the N24 road and a rail link. Carrick-on-Suir railway station opened on 15 April 1853. There are two trains a day to Waterford and two trains a day to Limerick Junction via Clonmel, Cahir and Tipperary. There is no train service on Sundays. Several buses also run on this route. There is a riverside walking and cycleway to Clonmel named the Blueway.

For the purposes of elections to Dáil Éireann, the town is part of the Tipperary South constituency.

== History ==
=== Development ===
Carrick-on-Suir (originally called Carrig Mac Griffin) was formed on an island settlement upstream of Waterford. The town remained as an island until the 18th century when small rivers were diverted to form dry land north and west of the town. The earliest known records of a settlement are dated to 1247, when a charter of 3 fairs per year was awarded to Matthew Fitzgriffin, Lord of the manor of Carrick who was a member of the Cambro-Norman nobility.

By the early 14th century, Carrick Mac Griffin had become home to a prosperous Hiberno-Norman family – the Butlers. The first significant leader of the Butler clan, Edmond Butler (a.k.a. Edmund le Bottilier) was created Earl of Carrick in 1315. However, his son James did not inherit the title. Instead, 7 years after the death of his father, he was created Earl of Ormond in his own right. In 1447, Edmund MacRichard Butler founded the first bridge over the estuary at Carrick-on-Suir. Other notable members of the Butler clan were Thomas Butler, 10th Earl of Ormond (a.k.a. Black Tom) who built the Tudor Manor House extension to Ormonde Castle and James the 12th Earl and 1st Duke of Ormond, who founded the town's woollen industry in 1670.

Edmond le Bottiler erected two large, heavily garrisoned castle keeps named the Plantagenet Castle on the north bank of the Suir, just east of what is now Main St. In the 15th century, a four towered castle was erected on the same site, two of which are now incorporated into the Elizabethan Manor House built by Black Tom Butler, c. 1560. The Manor House, where Archbishop Dermot O'Hurley, one of the most celebrated of the 24 Irish Catholic Martyrs, was arrested in 1583, still stands today, having been extensively refurbished by the Irish State in the 1990s and is open to the public.

The town was also the inspiration for the 16th-century song, Cailín ó chois na Siúire mé, which is attested to as early as 1595 and mentioned in William Shakespeare's Henry V as Caleno custure me.

In 1649, the town was taken by English Parliamentarians during the Cromwellian conquest of Ireland. They captured Carrick by stealth after discovering an undefended gate as part of operations during the Siege of Waterford. Irish troops from Ulster under a Major Geoghegan tried to re-take Carrick but were eventually beaten off with the loss of over 500 killed.

In 1670, the Butlers set up a woollen industry in the town. By 1799, the town enjoyed some prosperity from the woollen industry, fishing, basket weaving and other river-related businesses – the population reached around 11,000 by this point. In that year, a barge capsized on the river near the bride, resulting in the deaths of around 91 people. Over the next 120 years however, the town suffered from high taxes and levies imposed by the British on the woollen industry, leading to high unemployment, poverty and emigration. The Great Famine also contributed greatly to the depopulation of the town.

=== 20th century ===
With the coming of independence and the Civil War, Carrick was initially occupied by the Anti-Treaty IRA until the town fell to the Free State army in 1922. By this stage, industrialisation had reached Carrick with the establishment of cotton factories and a local creamery. Development of the town was also influenced by the arrival of the tanning industry in the 1930s. This industry provided regular, dependable employment in the town for the first time.

The local town council also embarked on building social housing projects in an effort to improve living conditions in the town. Despite these developments, economic opportunities were limited and poverty widespread – the town saw widespread emigration to Dublin, Britain and further afield especially during the recessions of the 1940s and 1950s.

The closure of the Pollack & Plunder tannery in 1985 impacted the economy of the town, as a significant proportion of the population (Carrick's population was roughly 4,000 by this point) were employed there or dependent on someone who was. Carrick suffered a prolonged recession throughout the 1980s and early 1990s, again leading the population to drop due to emigration. By the late-1990s, the economy of the town was on the upswing – unemployment had dropped, the SRAM bicycle component factory had opened as had a number of small businesses, and the population began to increase again for the first time in two centuries. As of 2006, no large manufacturing operation remained in the town as the SRAM plant closed that year.

== Features and amenities ==
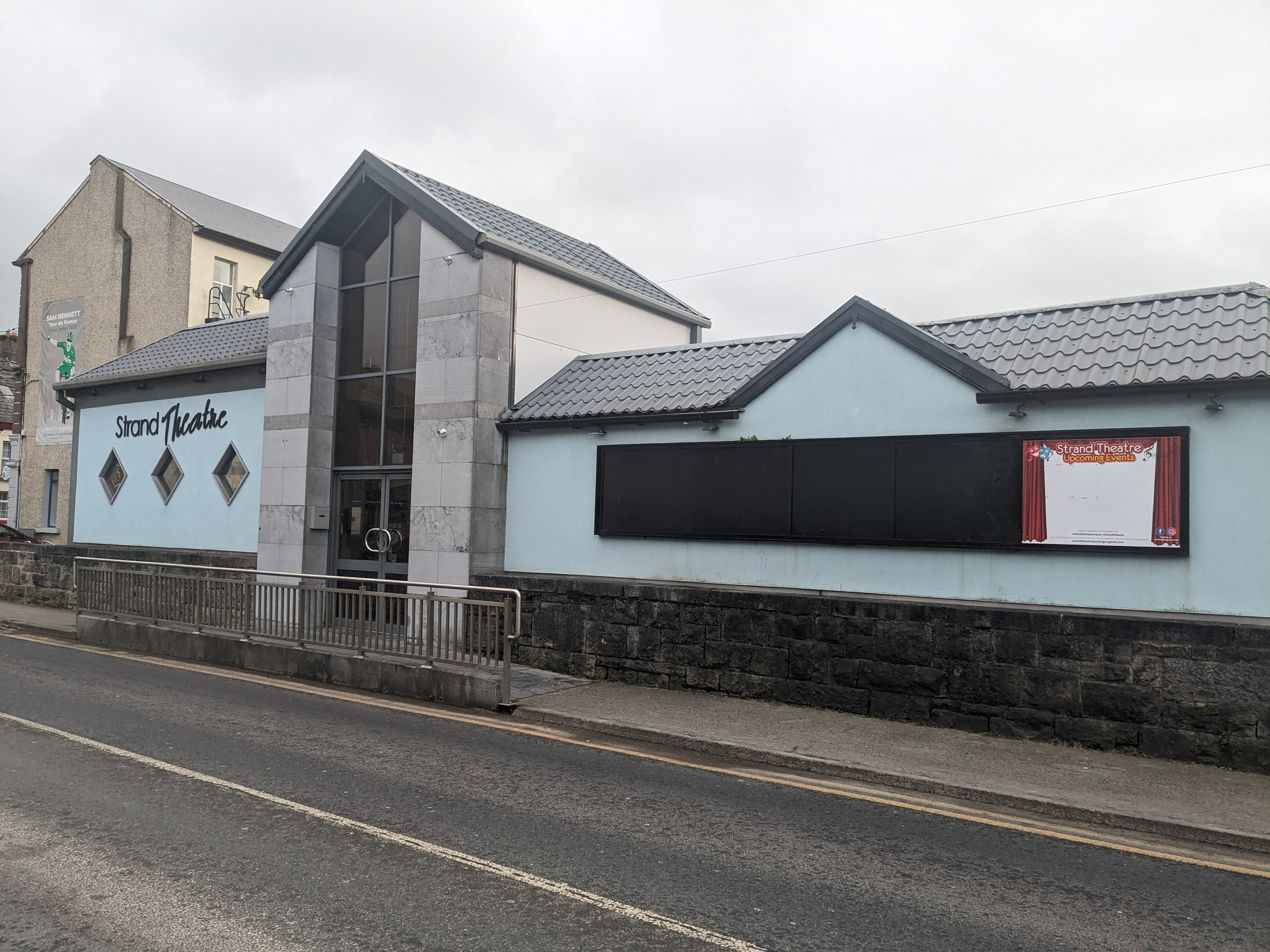
The Strand Theatre

There are two theatres in Carrick-on-Suir, the Brewery Lane Theatre and Arts Centre and the Strand Theatre. The Strand Theatre was opened in 1974 with actor and dramatist Micheál Mac Liammóir performing the opening ceremony. The 400-seat theatre was built by brothers Christy and Michael Butler. The theatre underwent significant renovations and was reopened in 2008.

The Brewery Lane Theatre and Arts Centre is located at the site of section of a brewery belonging to Richard Feehan. The brewery was later bought by James Sullivan, and was later bought by the Smithwick family in 1917. The building was bought and renovated by the Carrick-on-Suir Drama Group in the 1970s. The first performance in the theatre was Seán O'Casey's play The Plough and the Stars in 1980.

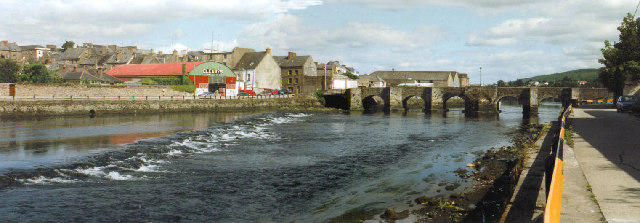
The Old Bridge, built in 1447

=== River Suir ===
Carrick-on-Suir is the tidal limit of the River Suir. Carrick has a 1-in-50-year flood defence system with quay walls ranging in height from 1.2m to 1.5m. Currently, the walls give protection from flooding caused by high tides. Flooding still occurs along the Glen/Mill River and Markievicz Terrace.

=== Landmarks ===
In 1447, a stone bridge was built, now known as the "Old Bridge". A new, more modern bridge was completed in 1880 and was reconstructed widened in 1975. The bridge was later named after John Dillon after his imprisonment at Dundalk Prison in 1888. There is a cast-iron plaque on the bridge commemorating the naming of the bridge.

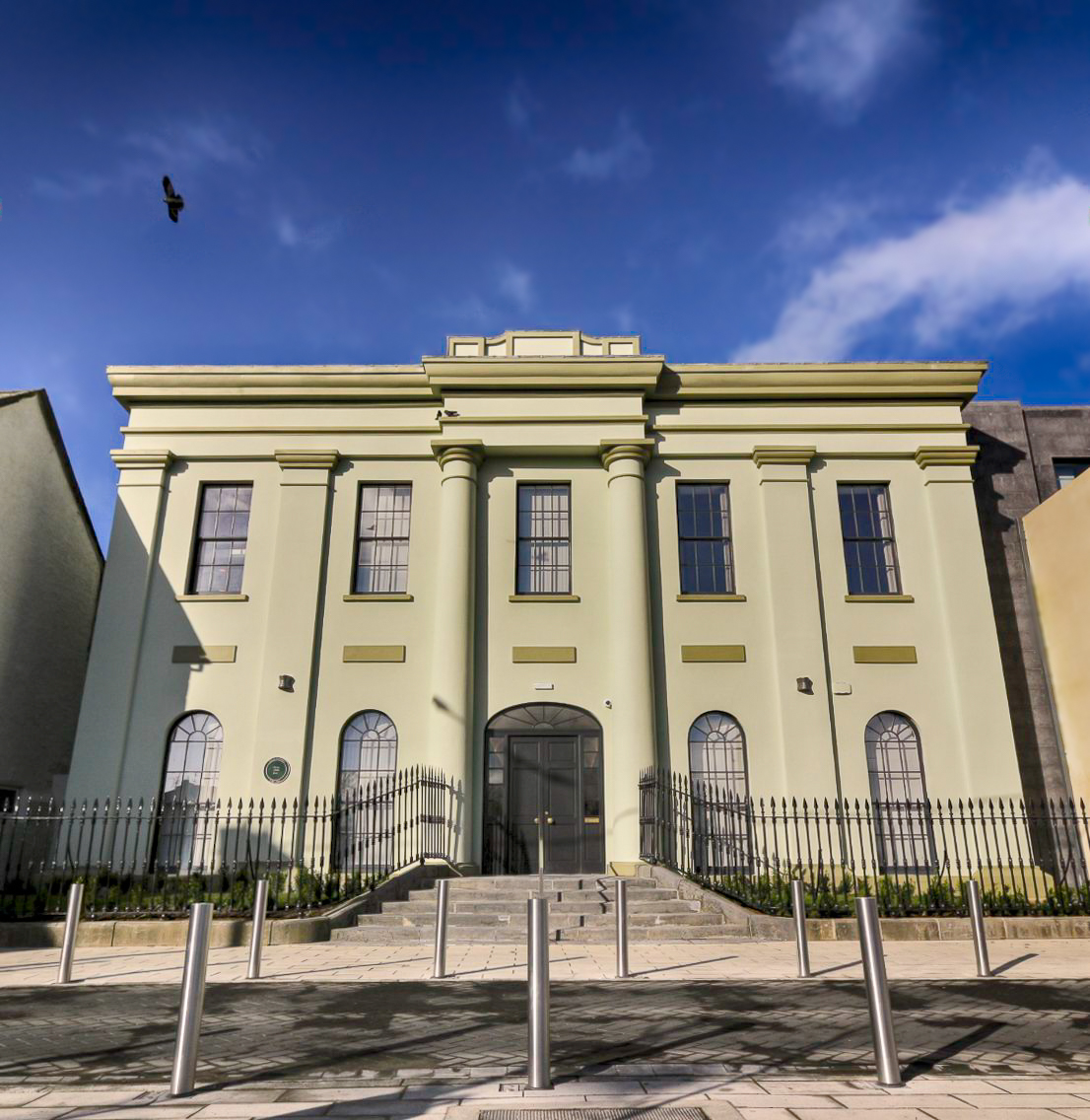
Carrick-on-Suir Town Hall

The Tholsel is a four-storey townhouse dating c. 1500 located at the West Gate. An octagonal lantern was erected c. 1750 and a clock tower with faces on three sides was added in 1784. A tholsel was a building used for local administration such as the collection of taxes and tolls.

A public park was created in the fair green in the 1860s. The fair green is a public open space used for play games and other outdoor pursuits.

Carrick-on-Suir Town Hall was completed in 1844. Originally constructed as a mechanics' institute, it was converted in a town hall in 1866. It is now used by Tipperary County Council for the provision of services to local residents.

=== Churches ===
There are three Catholic churches. The largest church in Carrick Mór is St Nicholas' church which was built in 1879, replacing an earlier church of the same name built in 1804. In Carrick Beg are the small St Molleran's parish church (parts of which date back to the 13th century) and the larger Franciscan friary. The Franciscan order's presence in Carrick dates back to 1336 with the granting of land for a friary by the 1st Earl of Ormond. However, the suppression of monasteries by Henry VIII led to the closure of the friary. Just prior to the invasion of Ireland by Cromwell, the friars had returned for an 11-year period, before being shut down again and the friars having to go underground to avoid persecution. It was not until 1820 and the onset of Catholic emancipation that the friars were able to fully return and a new chapel was built. The friars served the local community until the lack of vocations to the order led to the order finally leaving Carrick-Beg in 2006.

Before the Irish War of Independence, the Church of Ireland community was relatively substantial. After returning to Ireland from Newfoundland, famous 18th century Bard Donnchadh Ruadh Mac Conmara briefly converted to Protestantism and read aloud an Oath of Abjuration inside the Church of Ireland parish at Carrick-on-Suir. More recently, however, the former Protestant church on Main Street was abandoned until the late 1980s, but the church building and grounds have both been renovated and now serve as a heritage centre.

== Sport ==
GAA is represented in the area by Carrick Davins (named after the first GAA president Maurice Davin), Carrick Swans and St. Molleran's GAA clubs. The former two play in the Tipperary GAA area, and the latter in the Waterford GAA area. The 1904 All-Ireland Senior Hurling Championship final was played in Carrick-on-Suir. The match was held on Maurice Davin's land on 24 June 1906 between Cork and Kilkenny. Kilkenny won by a single point, 1–9 to 1–8.

Carrick United AFC is a junior (non-league, amateur) soccer team that plays in the Waterford & District League. The club plays at Tom Drohan park, and has had some success in the Waterford & District League, Munster Senior and Junior Cups and also in the FAI Junior Cup.

An amateur rugby team, Carrick-on-Suir RFC, plays in the Munster Junior League Division II. The club grounds are located east of the town in Tybroughney, County Kilkenny.

There is an 18-hole golf club, golf driving range, and swimming pool in the area. Castleview Lawn Tennis Club has four artificial grass courts, and Carrick-on Suir Handball and Racquetball Club is at Davin Park Indoor courts, Clonmel Road.

In cycling, 1988 Vuelta a España champion Sean Kelly and ten-time Grand Tour stage winner Sam Bennett are both from the town. The town is home to the Carrick Wheelers cycling club. Future Irish National Road Race champion Conor Dunne rode for the club in 2013, taking his first victory in a professional race on stage one of that year's An Post Rás.

There are also two boxing clubs (Carrick-on-Suir Boxing Club and St. Nicholas Boxing Club) and a triathlon club.

The 1986 English Greyhound Derby champion Tico was born in the town.

== Clubs and societies ==
The Carrick-on-Suir Musical Society (formed in 1943) is a musical and amateur operatic society. The Musical Society bought and refurbished the Strand Theatre on Main Street in 2003 for use by the Society. The Brewery Lane Drama Society (formed in 1955) performs several productions a year at their 75-person capacity theatre, which was formerly a malt house owned by Smithwicks.

The Irish Traction Group is based in Carrick-on-Suir, where restoration work is carried out on vintage diesel locomotives. Carrick-on-Suir also has a Republican Flute Band which plays at many Irish Republican and Sinn Féin events. Carrick Swim Club (Carrick Dippers) use the Sean Kelly Sports Centre as their base.

== Notable people ==
Notable people from the town include:

- Dorothea Herbert (1770–1829), writer
- Clancy Brothers, folk music group
  - Paddy Clancy, singer and harmonicist
  - Tom Clancy, singer and actor
  - Bobby Clancy, singer, banjo, guitar, harmonica and bodhrán
  - Liam Clancy, singer, guitarist and concertina
- Finbarr Clancy, singer, guitar, banjo, flute and bass with folk group The High Kings
- Maurice Davin, first President of the Gaelic Athletic Association, 1884–1887
- Michael Anthony Fleming, Roman Catholic bishop of St John's, Newfoundland
- Daryl Kavanagh, footballer for St Patrick's Athletic
- Sean Kelly, cyclist
- Gertrude Kelly, doctor and activist
- Sam Bennett, cyclist
- Tom Kiely, Olympic decathlon gold medalist at the 1904 Summer Olympics, from Ballyneale, just outside the town
- John Lonergan, recipient of the United States Government's Medal of Honor
- Fiona Glascott, actress
- Mick Roche, former Tipperary hurler
- Gerard Hogan, academic, constitutional lawyer, former judge of the Irish High Court and Court of Appeal and former Advocate-General of the Court of Justice of the European Union. Current judge of the Irish Supreme Court.
