= New Ross =

Town in County Wexford, Ireland

New Ross Ros Mhic Thriúin
- Town
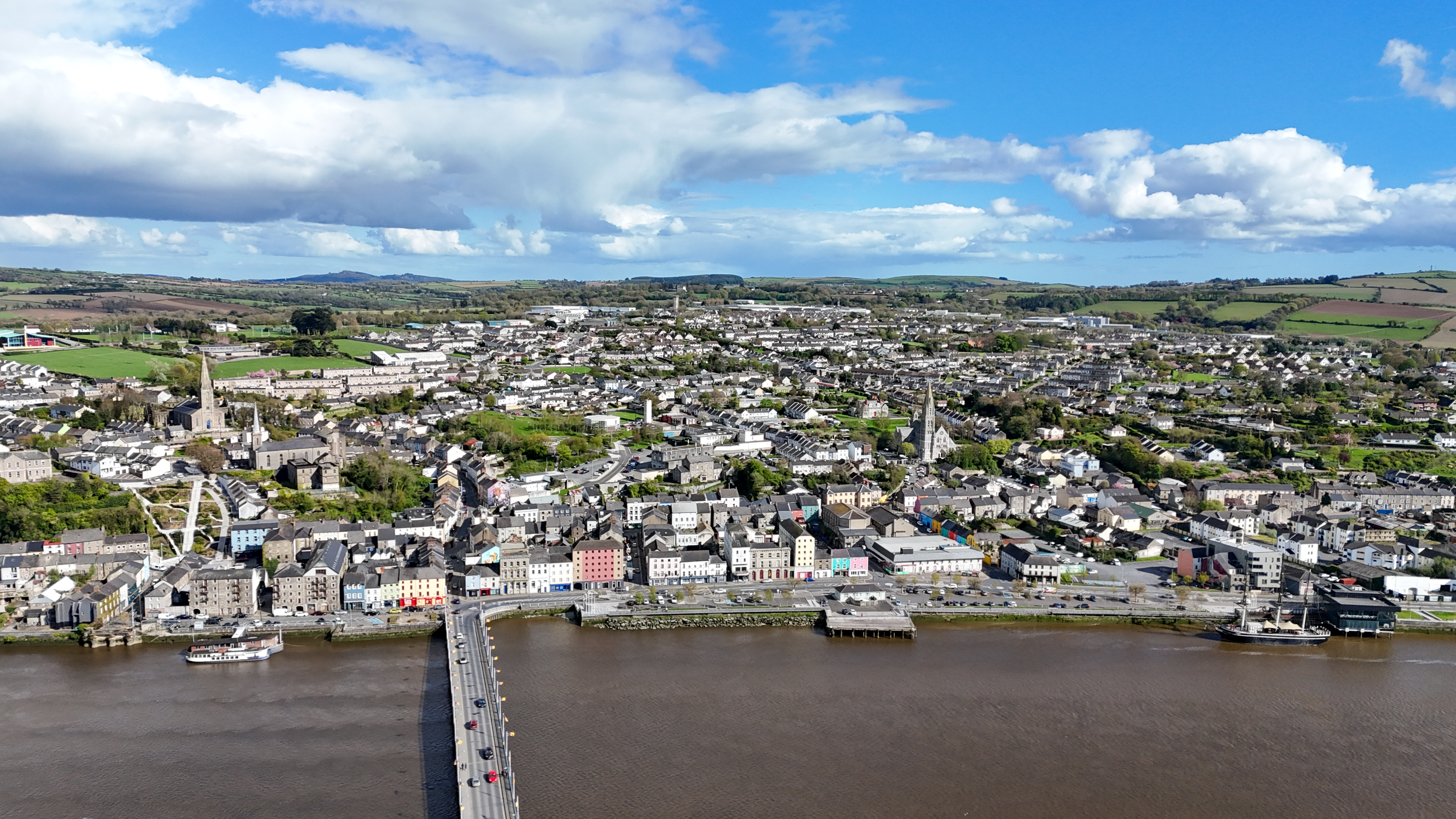
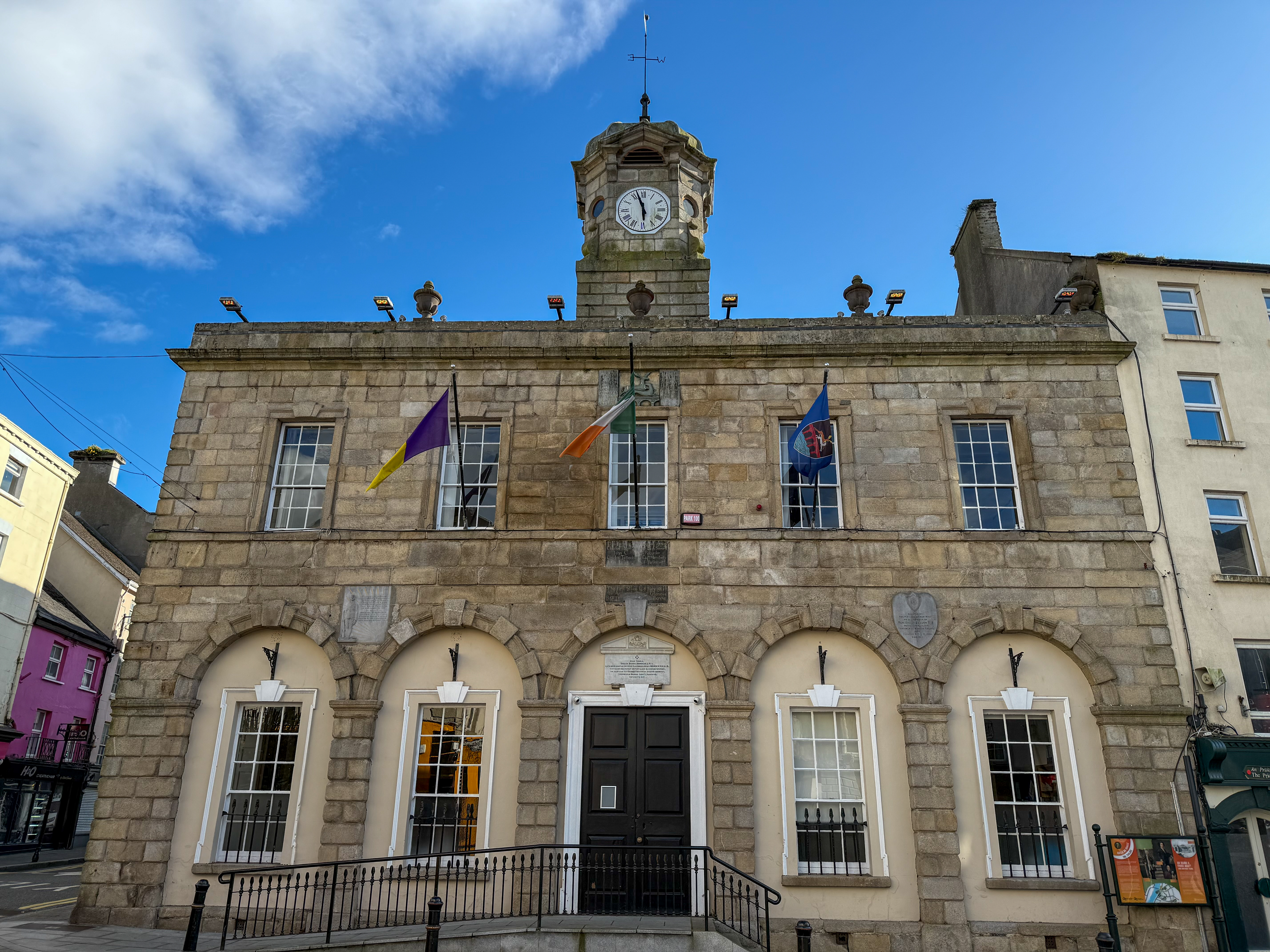
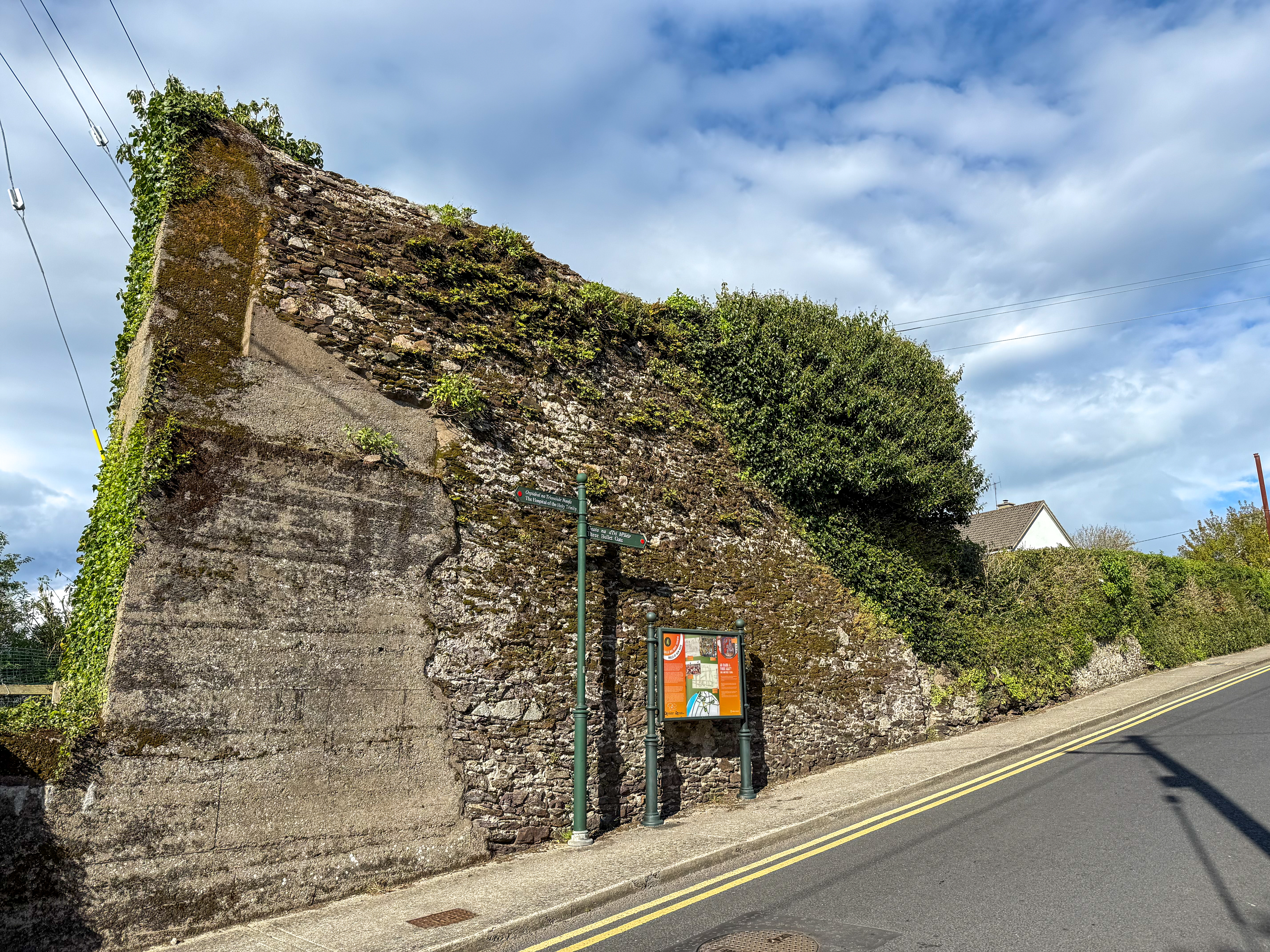
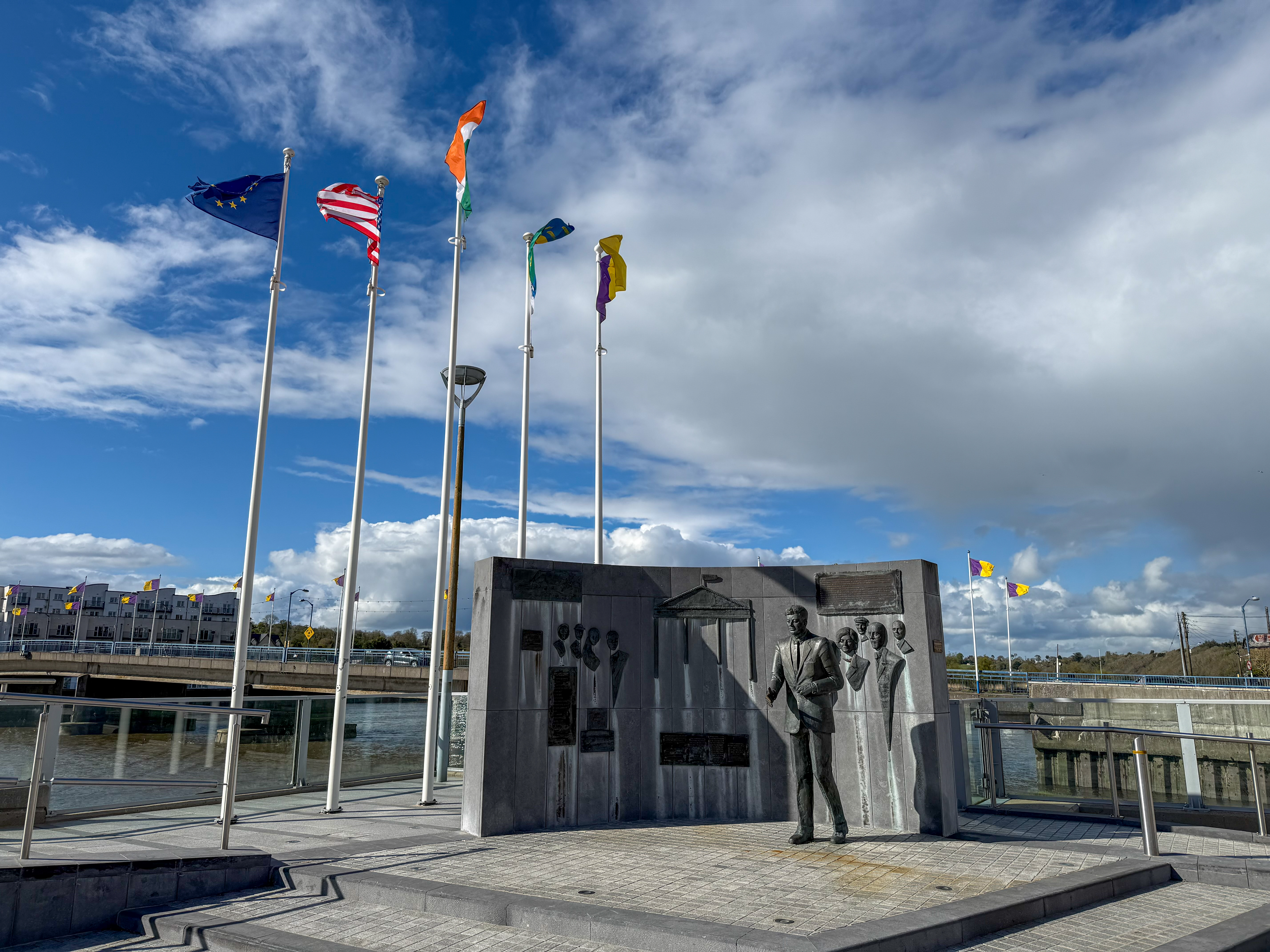
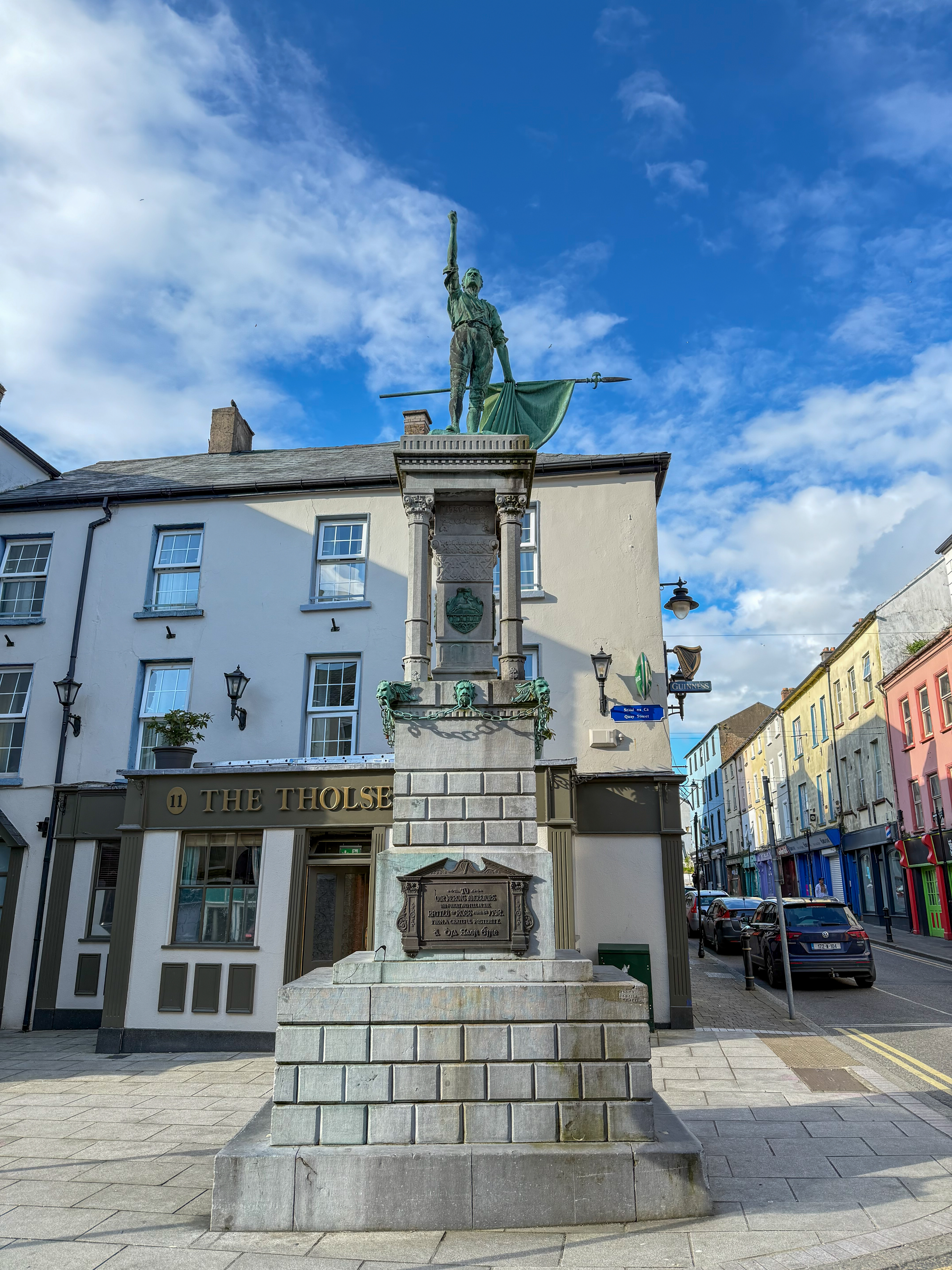
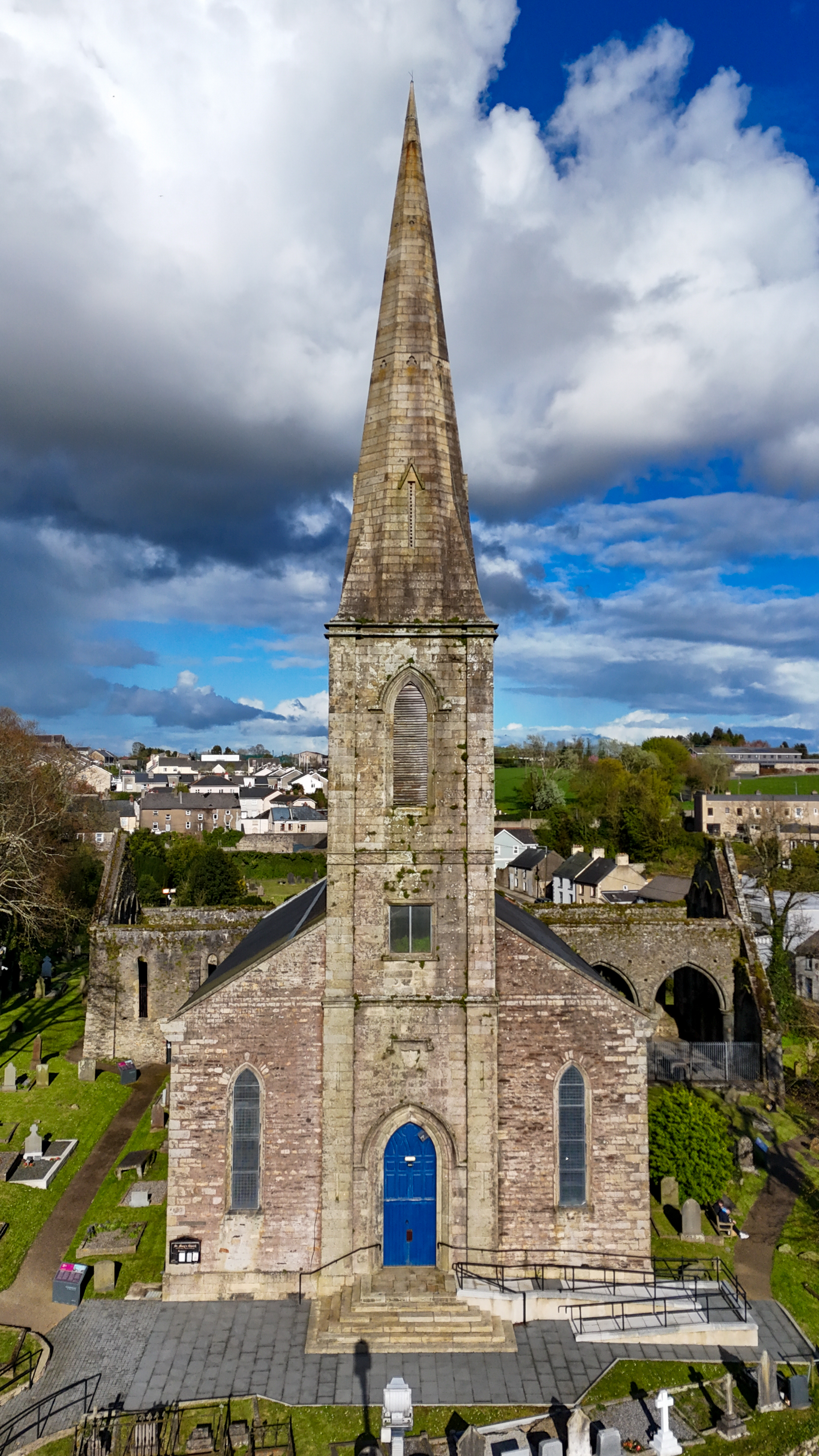
- Town skyline Town hall Town wall John F. Kennedy Memorial 1798 Monument St. Mary's Church

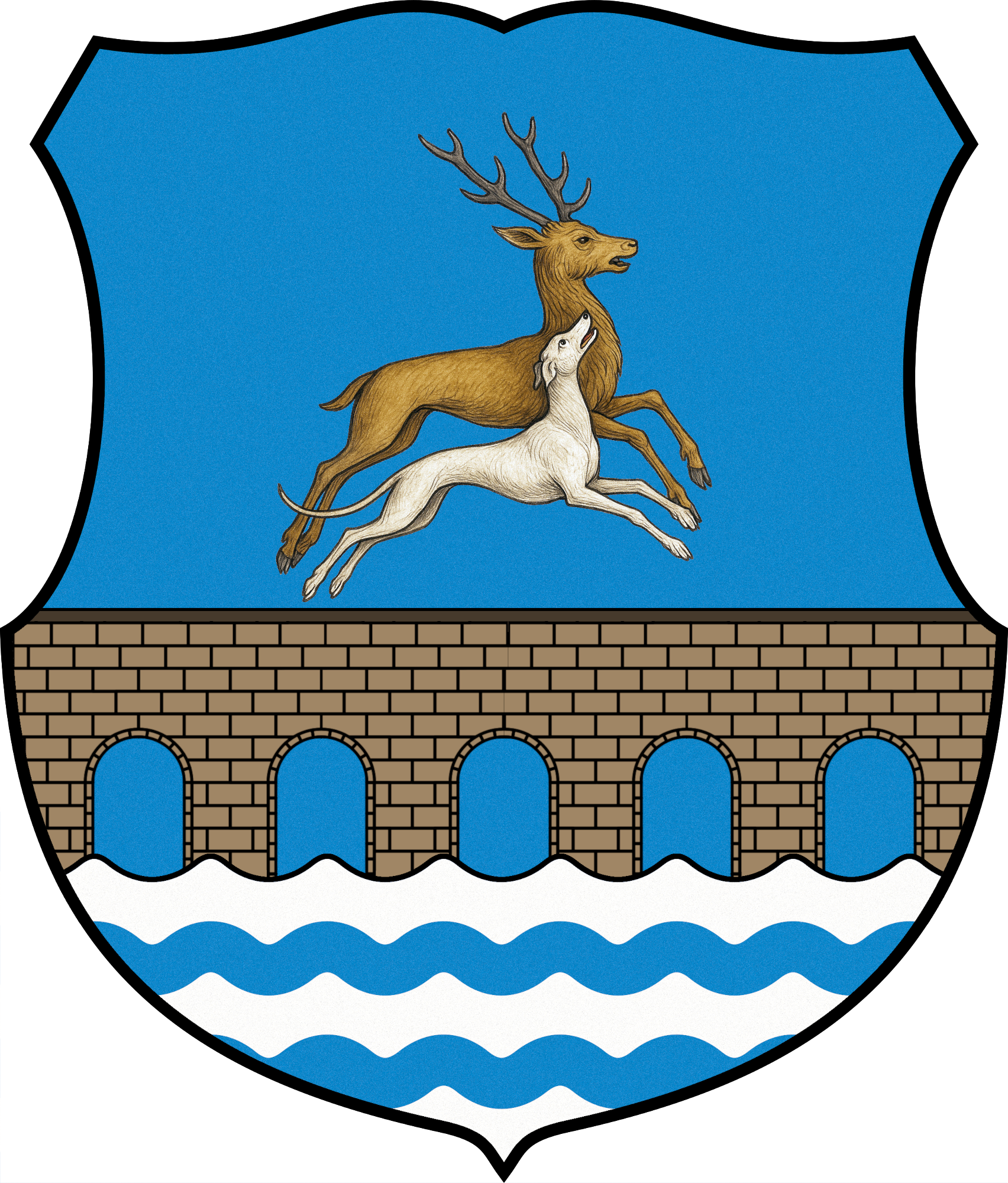
- Coat of arms

- Location in Ireland
- Coordinates: 52.396°N 6.945°W
- Country: Ireland
- Province: Leinster
- County: County Wexford
- Elevation: 30 m (98 ft)

Population (2022)
  - Urban: 8,610
- Time zone: UTC±0 (WET)
  - Summer (DST): UTC+1 (IST)
- Eircode routing key: Y34
- Telephone area code: +353(0)51
- Irish Grid Reference: S715278

Historical population
Year	Pop.	±%
1821	4,475	—
1831	5,011	+12.0%
1841	7,543	+50.5%
1851	7,903	+4.8%
1861	6,559	−17.0%
1871	6,772	+3.2%
1881	6,670	−1.5%
1891	5,847	−12.3%
1901	5,847	+0.0%
1911	5,547	−5.1%
1926	5,011	−9.7%
1936	5,056	+0.9%
1946	4,894	−3.2%
1951	4,903	+0.2%
1956	4,643	−5.3%
1961	4,494	−3.2%
1966	4,568	+1.6%
1971	5,153	+12.8%
1981	6,141	+19.2%
1986	6,357	+3.5%
1991	6,079	−4.4%
1996	6,147	+1.1%
2002	6,537	+6.3%
2006	7,709	+17.9%
2011	8,151	+5.7%
2016	8,040	−1.4%
2022	8,610	+7.1%

New Ross (Irish: Ros Mhic Thriúin, formerly Ros Mhic Treoin) (also formerly known as Rosspontum or Rosspont) is a town in southwest County Wexford, Ireland, on the River Barrow on the border with County Kilkenny, 20 kilometres (12 mi) northeast of Waterford. In 2022, it had a population of 8,610, making it the fourth-largest town in the county.

== History ==
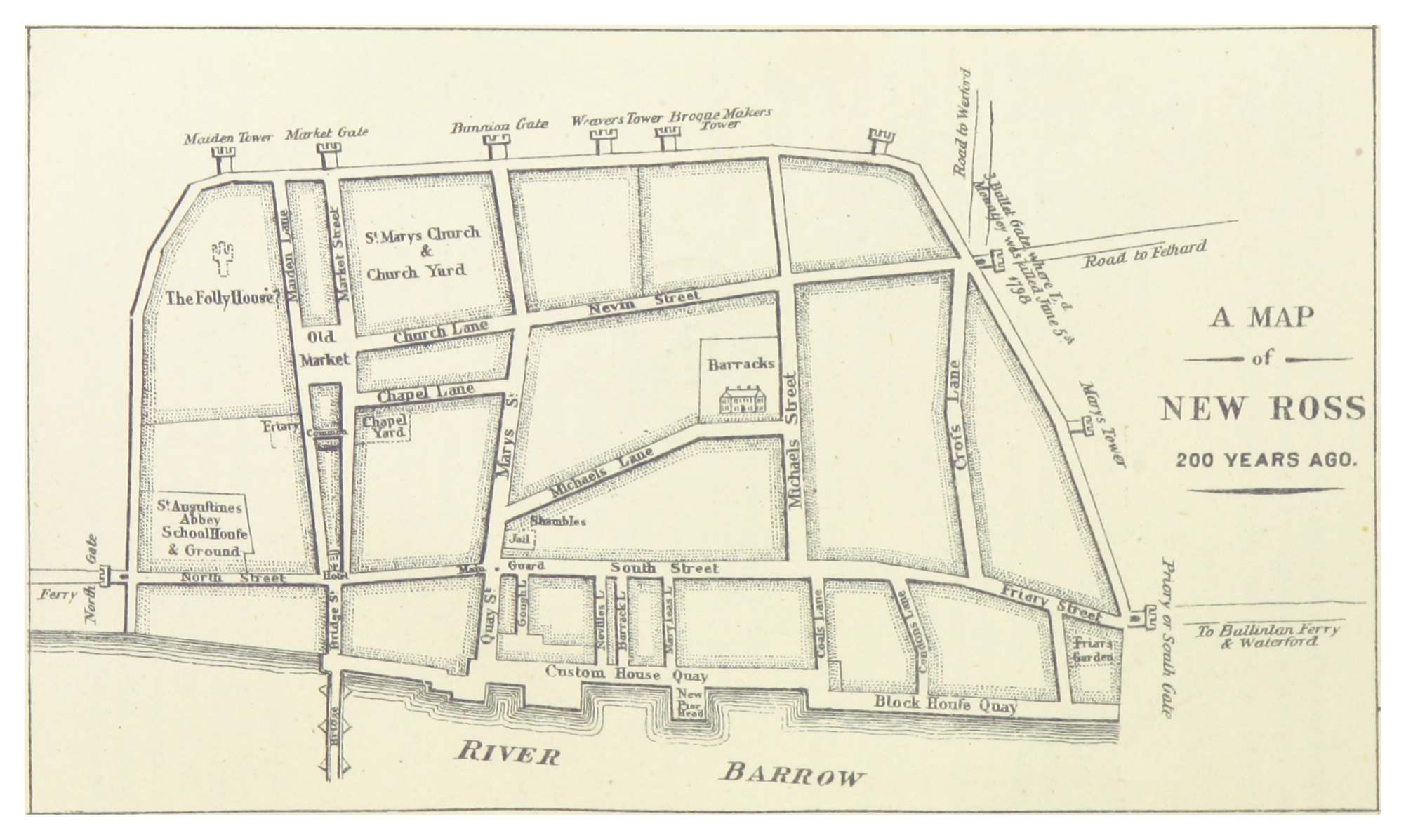
New Ross c. 1680

The port town of New Ross dates from the pre-Middle Ages. The earliest settlement in this area dates to the 6th century when St. Abban of Magheranoidhe founded a monastery in what is now Irishtown. Its name, Ros, was shortened from Ros Mhic Treoin, or the Wood of the Son of Treoin.

New Ross was in the territory of Dermot McMurrough and came to prominence when the Anglo-Normans conquered the region. The Norman knight William Marshall and his bride Isabella de Clare arrived during the early part of the 13th century. An earthen defensive structure called a motte was built at Old Ross in order to hold the newly conquered territory. A medieval borough sprung up around it - peopled by English and Welsh settlers. The arrival of Isabella and William is described in the Chronicles of Ross, which are in the British Museum. It records that in 1189, Isabella set about "building a lovely city on the banks of the Barrow".

The town grew around the bridge built by William Marshal, son-in-law of Richard de Clare, 2nd Earl of Pembroke (Strongbow), and a leader of the Norman invasion of Ireland. The town of New Ross (the town of the new bridge) was granted a Royal Charter in around 1279. In the late 13th century the town was placed for a time under a papal interdict, following a riot in which several monks of the Order of Crutched Friars were killed.

St Mary's Abbey (Church of Ireland) was built in 1210. There are two Roman Catholic churches, the parish church of SS. Michael and Mary completed in 1902, and the Augustinian church opened in 1835.

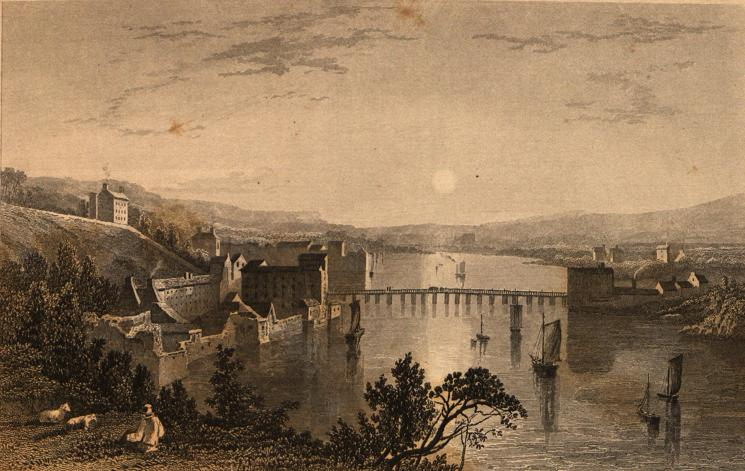
New Ross in 1832

The town was fought over in the Irish Confederate Wars of the 1640s. In 1643, the town resisted the siege by James Butler, 1st Duke of Ormond, who fought the Battle of New Ross with an Irish army under Thomas Preston, 1st Viscount Tara, but it was later re-conquered by Oliver Cromwell in 1649 who discharged three cannon shots at the Aldgate. Today, the gate is called "The Three Bullet Gate because of the three cannon shots. New Ross Town Hall was completed in around 1750.

The town was the location of one of the bloodiest battles of the 1798 rebellion.The battle of New Ross happened on the 6th of June 1798. The United Irishmen attacked the town from their camps on Carrigbyrne Hill and Lacken Hill. The United Irishmen defeated the garrison, but the British came back with reinforcements later in the day, taking the rebels by surprise and recapturing the town. This was the first major defeat the rebels faced.

== Education ==
Good Counsel College, New Ross, is an all-boys school that caters for over 750 students, making it the largest school in New Ross.The Good Counsels current campus was opened in 1984 to accommodate growing student numbers. Before, it was located down the town by the church. This was opened in the 1890's.

== Sport ==
Sporting organisations in the town of New Ross include New Ross RFC, New Ross Celtic Soccer Club, and New Ross Golf Club.There is a swimming club at the Apex Swimming Pool and Leisure Centre called New Ross Swim Club

== Arts and culture ==
The town's arts centre is St. Michael's Theatre. The present building was built in 1806, eight years after the insurrection of 1798 and served as the parish church until 1902, when the new parish church, St Mary's & Michael's, was opened. St. Michael's has a staff of 12, a 300-seat theatre, a 50-seat studio venue, an art gallery, a cinema, a coffee shop and a bar.

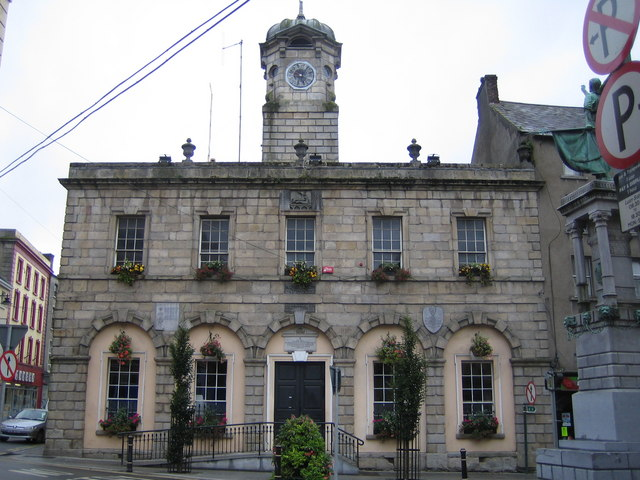
New Ross Town Hall

New Ross is home to the Ros Tapestry Project, a community initiative undertaken throughout County Wexford by a team of 150 voluntary embroiderers. The Ros Tapestries depict events including the founding of New Ross by William Marshall. The first tapestry was completed in 2002 and to date all but one of the 15 tapestries are complete. In 2009 the Ros Tapestry Exhibition was opened at The Quay, New Ross.

== Transport ==
=== Road ===
The road crossing the Barrow is the N25 road linking Cork, Waterford City 25 km (16 mi) away and Rosslare Harbour 40 km (25 mi) away. The N30 links Enniscorthy and New Ross. The R704 and R700 roads connect the town to various towns and villages in County Kilkenny such as Graiguenamanagh, Mullinavat and Kilkenny

=== Bus links ===
The town is served by several bus routes and its main stop is on the town's quay. There are services to and from Waterford each day. Bus Éireann is the principal operator providing Expressway services to Dublin and Dublin Airport and to Rosslare Europort and Cork as well as local services. Wexford Bus operate a service between Wexford and Waterford while Bus Eireann operates a route linking the town to Kilkenny on Thursday Only. Wexford Local Link operates services to Enniscorthy.

=== Rail ===
New Ross railway station (Rosbercon) opened on 19 September 1887, closed for passenger traffic on 30 March 1964 and closed for goods traffic by 1995. It was an important link between the lines serving Dublin to Rosslare, Bagenalstown via Palace East and on to Waterford up until the 1960s when CIÉ rationalised the railway network, but the section from Waterford to New Ross remained in use for cement and fertilizer traffic until 1995.

This railway line is currently being repurposed as a cycle greenway - The Southeast Greenway. The first section linking New Ross to Ballyverneen, near Glenmore Co Kilkenny, opened in June 2023. The greenway will eventually link Palace East to Waterford City via New Ross.

=== Sea ===
New Ross is Ireland's only inland port, located 32 km (20 mi) from the sea on the River Barrow. A small marina is located downstream of the town.The port still brings in small-medium sized bulk cargo vessels today. The port used to bring in steel, coal, grain, fertiliser and wood. The biggest ship to enter the port was the "Vesilios G" which was 10,000 tons.

== Economy ==
The Ros Tapestry Exhibition Centre located on the Quay in New Ross is a series of 15 embroidered Tapestry panels. The tapestries depict Celtic Ireland, Celtic rituals, woman warriors, Brehon Law, early Christian Ireland, the Vikings of Wexford, and the ousting of Diarmait MacMurchada from his Kingdom of Leinster and his sailing to France in search of King Henry II. Also depicted is William Marshal, Earl of Pembroke, who married Isabel de Clare, heiress of Strongbow and granddaughter of Diarmait MacMurchada.

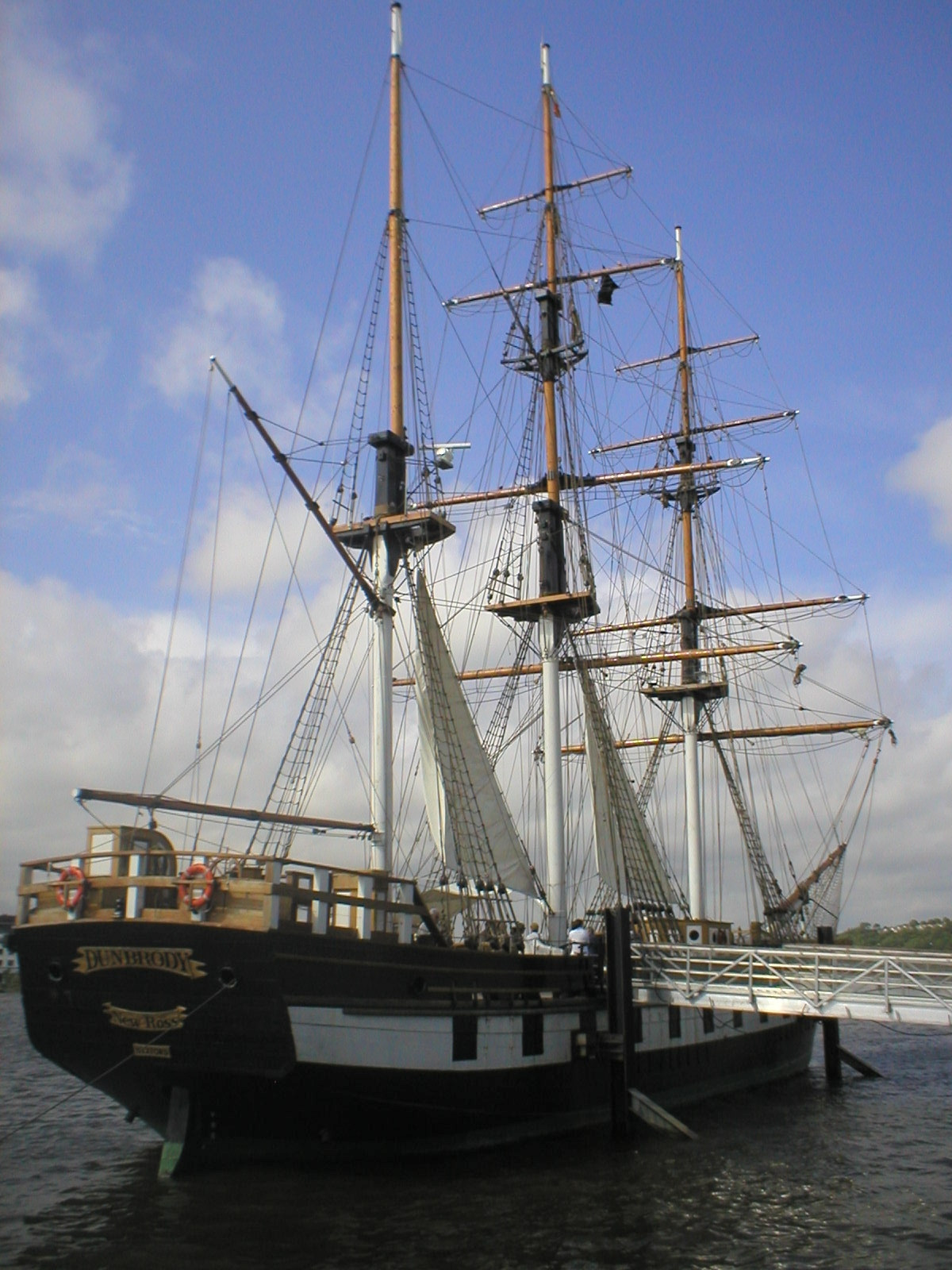
Dunbrody Ship—a full-scale replica of the original 19th century vessel.

New Ross is home to the Dunbrody replica famine ship, which is moored on the Quay.

The town also houses the Emigrant Flame, a constantly burning flame in memory of the emigrants of the famine.

A statue of John F. Kennedy is located on the quayside. The statue was unveiled in July 2008 by his sister Jean Kennedy Smith.

The name of Liverpool F.C.'s stadium at Anfield Road came from the old townland of Annefield in New Ross.

The Browne-Clayton Monument is located on the New Ross - Wexford Road (N25) approximately 12 km (7.5 mi) east of New Ross.

The Hook Lighthouse is located 39 km (24 mi) south of New Ross.

The Kennedy family Homestead, the ancestral home of US President John F Kennedy, is located 8 km (5.0 mi) south of New Ross, and the JFK Arboretum is also located to the south of the town.

== Notable people ==
- Greg Bolger, footballer with Cork City F.C., born New Ross
- Seán Connick, Fianna Fáil TD from 2007 to 2011.
- James Cullen, priest and founder of the Pioneer Total Abstinence Association, was born in New Ross
- Martin Doyle, Victoria Cross recipient
- Patrick Kennedy, great-grandfather and emigrant ancestor of U.S. President John F. Kennedy
- Gráinne Murphy, swimmer who won silver at the 2010 European Long Course Championships and bronze at the 2010 European Short Course Championships
- Seán O'Kennedy, captain of the record breaking Wexford Gaelic Football All-Ireland champions 1915-1918
- Thomas Joseph Power, Bishop of St. John's, Newfoundland
- John Redmond, MP for New Ross
- Maverick Sabre, singer

== Twinnings ==
New Ross has town twinning agreements with the communities of:

- Hartford, Connecticut, US
- Moncoutant, Poitou-Charentes, France
- Newcastle, County Down

== See also ==
- List of towns and villages in Ireland
- Market Houses in Ireland
