= DWWR 67 =

Irish rail locomotive

DW&WR 67
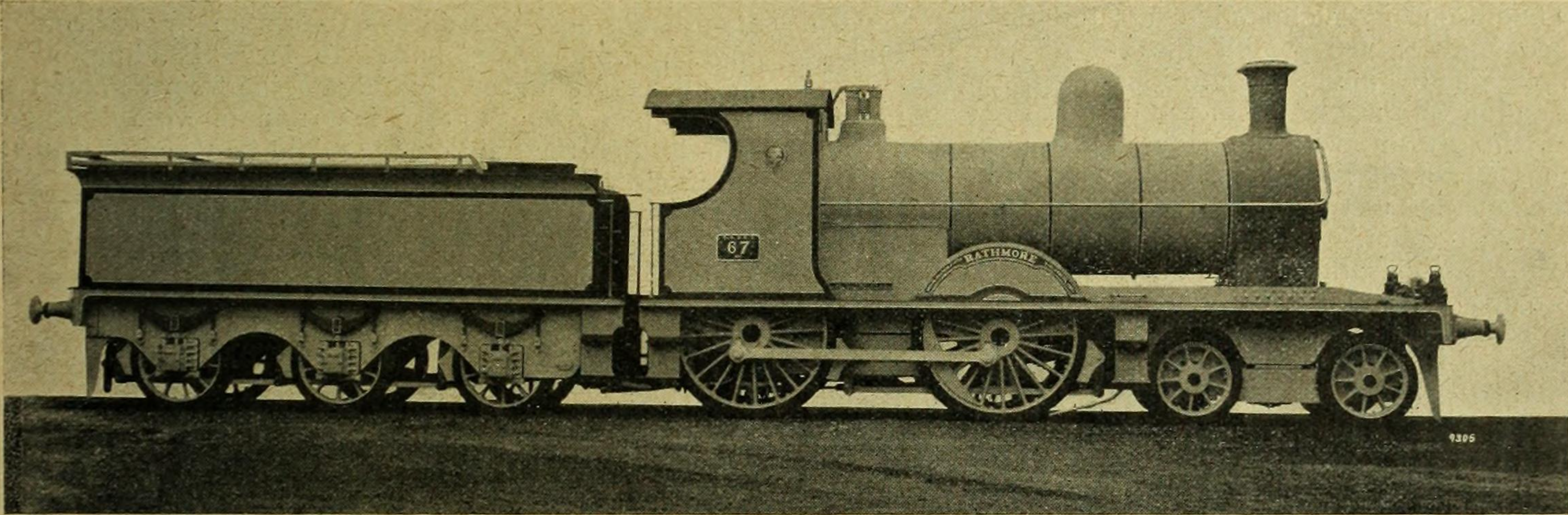
Type and origin
- Power type: Steam
- Designer: R. Cronin
- Builder: Beyer, Peacock & Company
- Serial number: 4645/6
- Build date: 1905
- Total produced: 2
Specifications
- Configuration
  - Whyte: 4-4-0
- Gauge: 5 ft 3 in (1,600 mm)
- Driver dia.: 6 ft 1 in (1,850 mm)
- Length: 33 ft (10,000 mm) (est.)
- Axle load: 15 long tons (15 t)
- Loco weight: 43.3 long tons (44.0 t)
- Water cap.: 2,600 imp gal (12,000 L; 3,100 US gal)
- Boiler pressure: 160 lbf/in^{2} (1.10 MPa)
- Cylinders: 2
- Cylinder size: 18 in × 26 in (457 mm × 660 mm)
Performance figures
- Tractive effort: 15,700 lbf (69.84 kN)
Career
- Operators: DW&WR; DSER; GSR; CIÉ
- Class: D8 (Inchicore)
- Power class: N/M
- Number in class: 2
- Numbers: 67 (GSR 454), 68
- Locale: Ireland
- Withdrawn: 1923, 1949
- Disposition: Both scrapped

DW&WR 67 (Rathmore) was a 4-4-0 locomotive built in 1905 at Beyer, Peacock & Company for the Dublin, Wicklow & Wexford Railway. It was accompanied by engine 68 (Rathcoole) from the same maker. They became the DW&WR's flagship passenger locomotives.

== Background ==
The locomotives were acquired in 1905 about the time DW&WR network expansion to Waterford was complete. They joined the DW&WR's other four 4-4-0s that had been in service for 10 years.

== History ==
The build quality of No. 67 was found to be lacking. It required a new front tube plate after only four years and it transpired the DW&WR had required Beyer-Peacock to cut costs. No. 68 was regarded as the better engine. No. 68 was hijacked and severely damaged in a head-on collision on 23 January 1923 at Palace East during the Civil War. Everyone had been disembarked from the affected trains first and there were no injuries.

On amalgamation to Great Southern Railways in 1925, the remaining engine was renumbered and made the only member of Class 454/D8. A 1948 C.I.E. report described it as "An undistinguished engine and the only engine of its class, consequently difficult to place: otherwise it is a fair medium powered passenger engine". It was withdrawn the following year.
