= DWWR 24 =

Irish rail locomotive

DW&WR 24
Type and origin
- Power type: Steam
- Designer: Meikle/John Wakefield
- Builder: Sharp Stewart
- Serial number: 1478–80 2304/5
- Build date: 1864, 1873
- Total produced: 5
Specifications
- Configuration
  - Whyte: 2-4-0
  - UIC: 1B n2
- Gauge: 5 ft 3 in (1,600 mm)
- Leading dia.: 3 ft 7 1/2 in (1,105 mm)
- Driver dia.: 5 ft 4 1/4 in (1,632 mm)
- Length: 29 ft (8,800 mm) (est.)
- Axle load: 11.5 long tons (11.7 t)
- Loco weight: 32.2 long tons (32.7 t)
- Water cap.: 2,100 imp gal (9,500 L; 2,500 US gal)
- Boiler pressure: 160 lbf/in^{2} (1.10 MPa)
- Cylinders: 2
- Cylinder size: 16 in × 22 in (406 mm × 559 mm)
Performance figures
- Tractive effort: 11,140 lbf (49.55 kN)
Career
- Operators: DW&WR; DSER; GSR
- Class: G7 (Inchicore)
- Power class: Q
- Number in class: 4
- Numbers: 24,25,26,32,33; 422 (GSR)
- Locale: Ireland
- Withdrawn: 1928

Dublin, Wicklow and Wexford Railway (DW&WR) 24 was the lead engine of a class of five 2-4-0 tender locomotives built in two batches in 1864 and 1873.

== History ==
The engines are attributed to the locomotive superintendent William Meikle and the first three, Nos. 24 (Glenamore), 25 (Gleanart) and No. 26 were supplied in 1864. A further two, No. 32 (Glenmalure) and No. 33 (Glendalough) with detail differences followed in 1873. (Note: The initial date of 1964 preceded John Wakefield's appointment although some sources attribute the locomotives to him)

At this time the DW&WR was extending south, from Enniscorthy in 1963 to Wexford by 1874. These engines took over the main line express passenger trains to Wicklow and Wexford from earlier 2-4-0 types. They continued to work main line expresses until replaced by more powerful 4-4-0s in 1895.

No. 26 (Blackrock) was converted into a 2-4-0T locomotive in 1900 and served on the Shillelagh branch line thereafter.

No. 25 was Irish Civil War loss. All were life expired by 1925 and withdrawn immediately on the amalgamation to Great Southern Railways apart from No. 24 which lasted until 1928 becoming GSR No. 422 and the sole member of class 422 / G7.
