= DWWR 55 =

Irish locomotive class

DW&WR 55
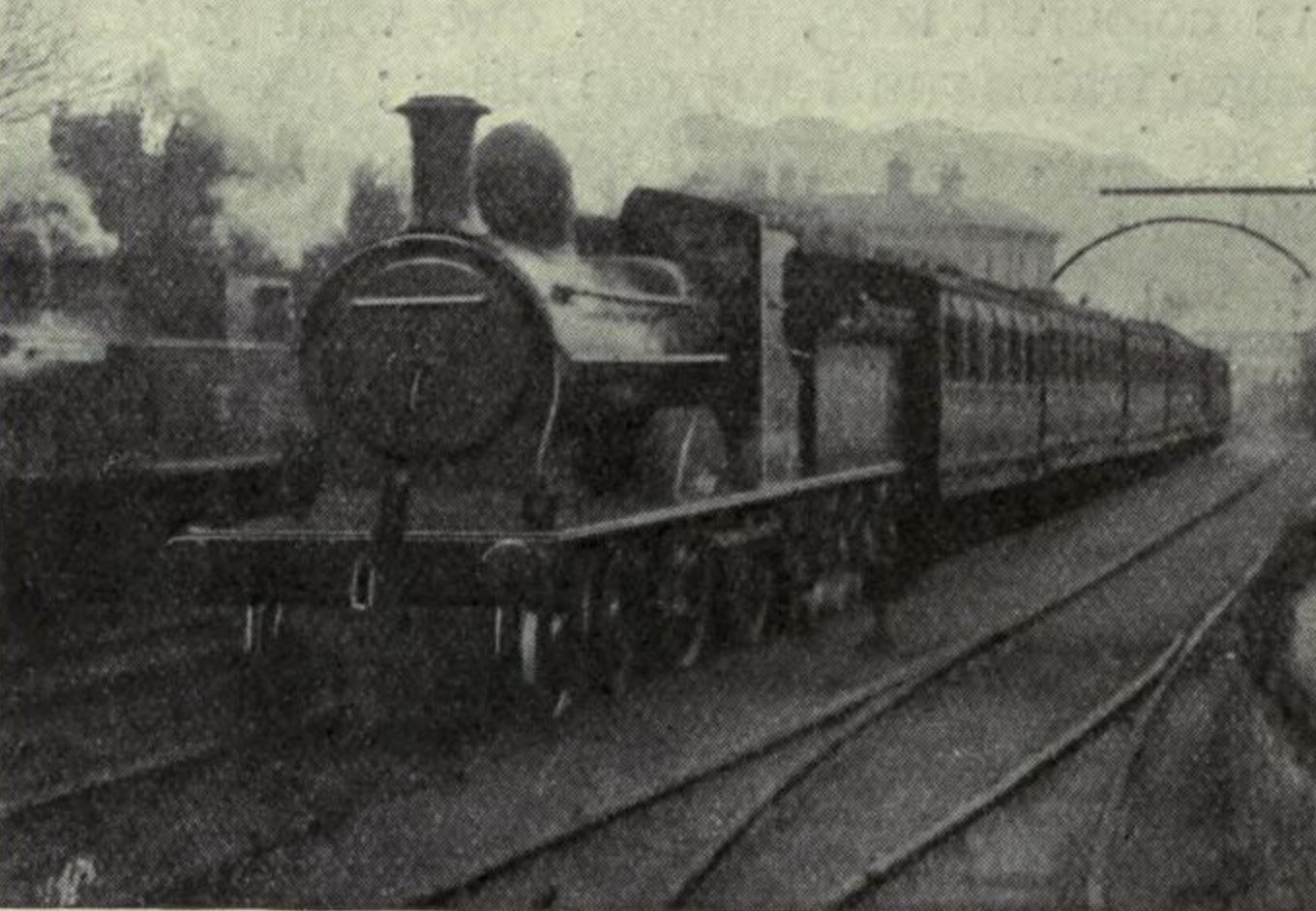
Type and origin
- Power type: Steam
- Designer: Grierson
- Builder: Vulcan Foundry
- Serial number: 1448/49, 1455/56
- Build date: 1895–1896
- Total produced: 4
- Rebuilder: Grand Canal Street
- Rebuild date: 1906–1923
- Number rebuilt: 4
Specifications
- Configuration
  - Whyte: 4-4-0
- Gauge: 5 ft 3 in (1,600 mm)
- Leading dia.: 3 ft 3 in (990 mm)
- Driver dia.: 6 ft 1 in (1,850 mm)
- Length: 34 ft (10,000 mm) (est.)
- Axle load: 15 long tons (15 t)
- Loco weight: 43.75 long tons (44.45 t)
- Water cap.: 2,600 imp gal (12,000 L; 3,100 US gal)
- Boiler pressure: 160 lbf/in^{2} (1.10 MPa)
- Cylinders: Two
- Cylinder size: 18 in × 26 in (457 mm × 660 mm)
Performance figures
- Tractive effort: 15,700 lbf (69.84 kN)
Career
- Operators: DW&WR; DSER; GSR
- Class: D9 (Inchicore)
- Power class: N/M
- Numbers: DWWR/DSER: 55–58; GSR: 450–453
- Locale: Ireland
- Withdrawn: 1929-1940
- Disposition: All scrapped
- Details are for No. 56 after 1911 rebuild

Dublin, Wicklow and Wexford Railway (DW&WR) 55 to 58 were 4-4-0 locomotives built from 1895 at Vulcan Foundry for express passenger duties on the Dublin—Wexford mainline. They were to remain the DW&WR's and subsequent Dublin and South Eastern Railway's leading express passenger locomotive until the arrival of Nos. 67 and 68 some ten years later.

== History ==
These 4-4-0 locomotives built from 1895 at Vulcan Foundry and named Rathdown, Rathmines, Rathnew and Rathdrum. In their initial form they were poor steamers, the suggestion being the locomotive superintendent Grierson had specified larger cylinders on a previous design for an English railway without balancing this with an increased boiler. His successor Cronin rebuilt the locomotives with Belpaire boilers resulting in improved performance. On amalgamation to Great Southern Railways in 1925 they became numbered 450 to 453 and allocated to class 450/D8. (Note: No. 453 had a different boiler and was sometimes referred as Class 453/D9. It was the only survivor after 1934.) They were withdrawn between 1939 and 1940.

== Operations ==
These engines took over the express passenger trains from the smaller 2-4-0 type on the DW&WR's Dublin—Wexford mainline route. (Note: The Dublin—Wexford was the DW&WR's only mainline route. It did have an extension to Waterford but the rival GS&WR's route their from Dublin was far more direct.)
