= New Ross Town Hall =

Municipal building in New Ross, County Wexford, Ireland

- Halla an Bhaile Ros Mhic Thriúin
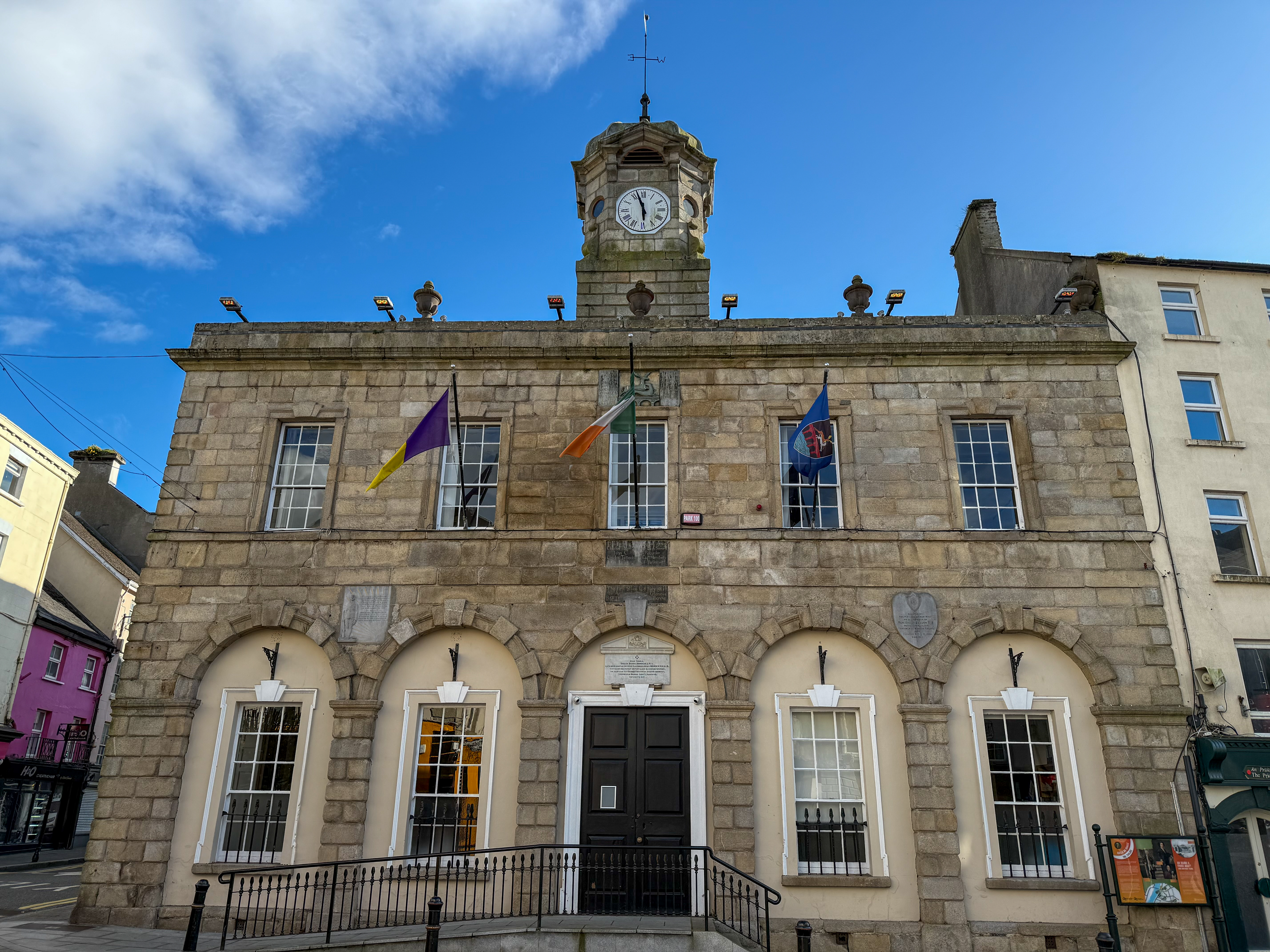

- Location within Ireland

General information
- Architectural style: Georgian, Neoclassical style
- Location: Quay Street, New Ross, Ireland
- Coordinates: 52.3955°N 6.9443°W
- Estimated completion: 1750
- Renovated: 1806

Technical details
- Material: granite

Design and construction
- Architects: William Kent (1749), John Robinson (1806)
- Developer: Charles Tottenham

New Ross Town Hall (Irish: Halla an Bhaile Ros Mhic Thriúin), formerly known as The Tholsel, is a municipal building in Quay Street, New Ross, County Wexford, Ireland. The building, which was used as the local market house through much of its life, is now used as a civic building.

== History ==
The building was commissioned by the local member of the Irish parliament and mayor of New Ross, Charles Tottenham. The site he selected had been occupied by the medieval market cross, which was erected in 1320. The foundation stone of the new building, which was inscribed to record the fact that it was laid on an anniversary of the Battle of the Boyne, was laid on 1 July 1749. The building was designed by William Kent in the neoclassical style, built in ashlar granite and was completed in around 1750.

The design involved a symmetrical main frontage of five bays facing onto Quay Street. It was arcaded on the ground floor, so that markets could be held, with an assembly hall on the first floor. There were five openings with imposts, voussoirs and double keystones on the ground floor and five sash windows with architraves on the first floor. At roof level, there was a cornice, a parapet and three urns. There was also a two-stage cupola with a square first stage and an octagonal second stage with clock faces, all surmounted by an ogee-shaped dome and a weather vane.

The building, then referred to as the "Main Guard", was used by the loyalist forces as their headquarters for their successful defence of the town against an attack by 3,000 rebels during the Battle of New Ross in June 1798 during the Irish Rebellion. Following subsidence associated with the close proximity of the building to the River Barrow, it was substantially rebuilt to a design by John Robinson in 1806.

By 1837, the building was deemed too small for the sale of agricultural products and, instead, it was used for the sale of leather. The assembly room on the first floor was used by the borough council until New Ross Corporation was abolished under the Municipal Corporations (Ireland) Act 1840.

By the mid-19th century, the ground floor had been enclosed and converted into reading rooms. The town commissioners, appointed to administer the town at that time, decided to use the assembly room on the first floor as their meeting place. The building then became the offices and meeting place of New Ross Urban District Council when it was formed in 1900. A statue depicting a rebel pikeman, designed by the Reverend Edward Foran to commemorate the Irish men and women who had died in the Battle of New Ross in 1798, was unveiled outside the town hall by the Reverend Thomas Quigley on 28 June 1907.

A plaque to commemorate the life of the Bishop of Kildare and Leighlin, James Warren Doyle, was installed above the front door and unveiled on the centenary of his death by the Provincial of the Order of Saint Augustine, Father Joseph Hennessy, on 16 June 1934. Following the death of the founder of the Pioneer Total Abstinence Association, the Reverend James Cullen, in 1921, another plaque was unveiled in his memory, in the spandrel above the windows on the right-hand side of the building. A further plaque, intended to commemorate the life of the rebel leader, Michael O'Hanrahan, who took part in the Easter Rising, was installed in the spandrel above the windows on the left-hand side of the building in the 1940s.

In June 1963, President John F. Kennedy visited the town to see where his ancestors had lived before emigrating to the US during the Great Famine. Following his assassination in November 1963, a bust of the former president was commissioned and installed in the town hall. The building continued to be used as the offices of the urban district council until 2002, and then as the offices of the successor town council, but ceased to be the local seat of government in 2014, when the council was dissolved and administration of the town was amalgamated with Wexford County Council in accordance with the Local Government Reform Act 2014.
