= Palace East railway station =

Station and railway network junction in Ireland

Palace East

General information
- Location: Ireland
- Train operators: DW&WR; GS&WR; GSR; CIÉ
Location

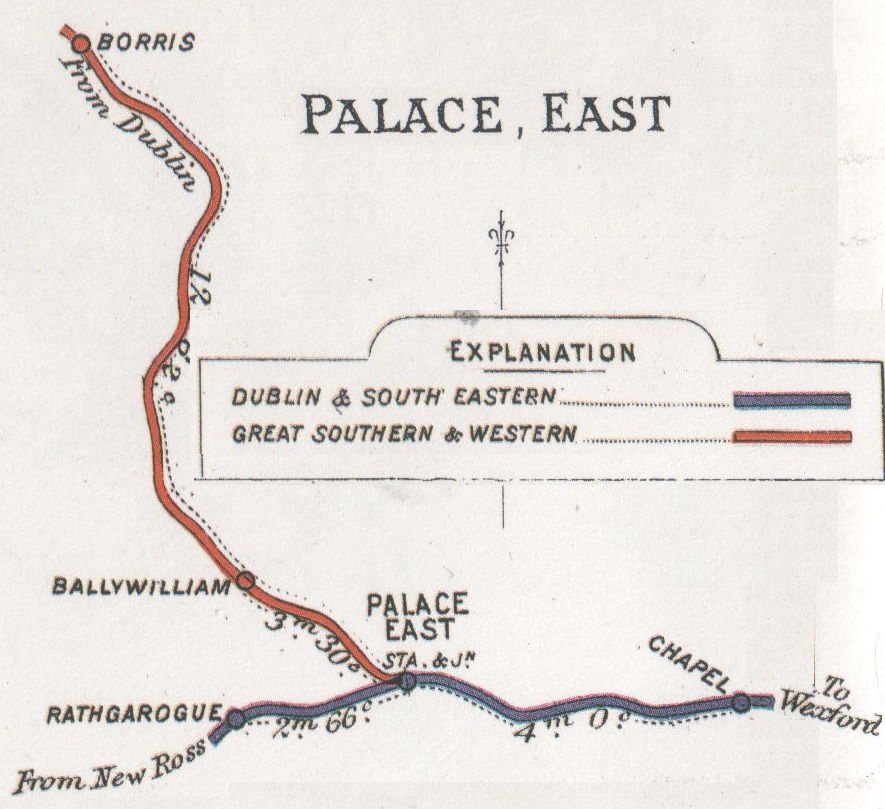
D&SER and GS&WR rail connection at Palace East

Palace East railway station was the only location where the Dublin, Wicklow and Wexford Railway was connected to the Great Southern and Western Railway and the rest of Irish rail network until the opening of the City of Dublin Junction Railway in 1891. This connection was described by Ahrons as "in the wilds of Wexford, which was of no use to anybody". Palace East was the scene of a staged head-on collision during the Irish Civil War.

The station was opened in 1866. It closed in 1963.
