= List of Privy Counsellors (2022–present) =

List of Privy Council members appointed by Charles III

This is a list of members of the Privy Council of the United Kingdom appointed since the accession of King Charles III in 2022. Together with those appointed during the reign of Queen Elizabeth II who are still living, they make up the current membership of the Council.

The oldest and earliest-appointed Privy Counsellor is The Lord Rodgers of Quarry Bank (born 1928, aged 98), who was appointed in 1975. The youngest Privy Counsellor is Kanishka Narayan (born 1989, aged 37).

== Charles III ==
=== 2022 ===
- Sir Clive Alderton (b. 1967)
- Edward Argar (b. 1977)
- Kemi Badenoch (b. 1980)
- Simon Case (b. 1978)
- David TC Davies (b. 1970)
- Vicky Ford (b. 1967)
- Dame Sarah Falk (b. 1962)
- John Glen (b. 1974)
- James Heappey (b. 1981)
- Sir Mark Horner (b. 1956)
- Ranil Jayawardena (b. 1986)
- The Lord Kennedy of Southwark (b. 1962)
- Gillian Keegan (b. 1968)
- Stephen McPartland (b. 1976)
- Wendy Morton (b. 1967)
- Chris Philp (b. 1976)
- Victoria Prentis (b. 1971)
- Jeremy Quin (b. 1966)
- Rachel Reeves (b. 1979)
- Chloe Smith (b. 1982)
- Graham Stuart (b. 1962)
- The Lord True (b. 1951)
- Tom Tugendhat (b. 1973)

=== 2023 ===
- Victoria Atkins (b. 1976)
- Steve Baker (b. 1971)
- Sir Graham Brady (b. 1967)
- Alex Chalk (b. 1976)
- Claire Coutinho (b. 1985)
- Maria Eagle (b. 1961)
- Richard Holden (b. 1985)
- Marcus Jones (b. 1974)
- Kelly Tolhurst (b. 1978)
- Laura Trott (b. 1984)
- Craig Whittaker (b. 1962)
- Craig Williams (b. 1985) (removed 2026)
- Humza Yousaf (b. 1985)

=== 2024 ===
- Heidi Alexander (b. 1975)
- Lord Armstrong (b. 1956)
- Sir Jeremy Baker (b. 1958)
- Lord Beckett
- Lord Clark (b. 1955)
- Anneliese Dodds (b. 1978)
- Stephen Flynn (b. 1988)
- Sir Peter Fraser (b. 1963)
- Vaughan Gething (b. 1974)
- Louise Haigh (b. 1987)
- Richard Hermer (b. 1968)
- Sir David Holgate (b. 1956)
- Darren Jones (b. 1986)
- Liz Kendall (b. 1971)
- Peter Kyle (b. 1970)
- Shabana Mahmood (b. 1980)
- The Baroness Morgan of Ely (b. 1967)
- Ian Murray (b. 1976)
- Lisa Nandy (b. 1979)
- Dame Janice Pereira
- Bridget Phillipson (b. 1983)
- Lucy Powell (b. 1974)
- Steve Reed (b. 1963)
- Jonathan Reynolds (b. 1980)
- Gavin Robinson (b. 1984)
- Jo Stevens (b. 1966)
- Wes Streeting (b. 1983)
- John Swinney (b. 1964)
- Owen Thompson (b. 1978)
- Michael Tomlinson (b. 1977)
- Sir Antony Zacaroli (b. 1958)

=== 2025 ===
- Lady Carmichael (b. 1969)
- Sir Stephen Cobb (b. 1962)
- Sir Adrian Colton (b. 1963)
- The Baroness Chapman of Darlington (b. 1973)
- Sir Ian Dove (b. 1963)
- Lord Ericht (b. 1963)
- Dame Juliet May (b. 1961)
- James Murray (b. 1983)
- Ellie Reeves (b. 1980)
- Emma Reynolds (b. 1977)
- Sir Anthony Smellie
- Anna Turley (b. 1978)

=== 2026 ===
- Lord Arthurson (b. 1964)
- Lord Braid
- Sir Chris Bryant (b. 1962)
- Christopher Butcher (b. 1962)
- Ruth Charteris (b. 1973)
- Dame Sara Cockerill (b. 1968)
- Dame Angela Eagle (b. 1961)
- Miatta Fahnbulleh (b. 1979)
- Hamish Falconer (b. 1985)
- Timothy Fancourt (b. 1964)
- Sir David Foxton (b. 1965)
- Rhun ap Iorwerth (b. 1972)
- Dan Jarvis (b. 1972)
- Stephen Kinnock (b. 1970)
- Denise McBride
- Richard Meade (b. 1966)
- Anneliese Midgley (b. 1976)
- Sir Robert Miles (b. 1962)
- Kanishka Narayan (b. 1989)
- Alex Norris (b. 1984)
- Matthew Pennycook (b. 1982)
- Lucy Rigby (b. 1982)
- Dame Amanda Yip
