= 2026 Special Honours =

British list of honours

As part of the British honours system, Special Honours are issued at the Monarch's pleasure at any given time. The Special Honours refer to the awards made within royal prerogative, operational honours, political honours and other honours awarded outside the New Year Honours and Birthday Honours.

== Life peerage ==
- Anas Sarwar, MSP – Appointed as Minister of State in the Department for Business, Innovation, Science and Trade; to be Baron Sarwar, of Maxwell Park in the City of Glasgow – 24 August 2026
- Ruth Mackenzie, CBE – Appointed as Parliamentary Under-Secretary of State in the Department for Digital, Culture, Media and Sport; to be Baroness Mackenzie of Sherwood, of Sherwood in the City of Nottingham – 24 August 2026
- The Right Honourable Lord Briggs of Westbourne, PC – Appointed as President of the Supreme Court of the United Kingdom.

== Lord-Lieutenant ==
- Brian Wyndham Payne, MStJ, DL – to be Lord-Lieutenant of Berwickshire – 16 January 2026
- Neelam Dharni Devesher, MBE, DL – to be Lord-Lieutenant of Surrey – 6 March 2026
- Mark John Pendlington – to be Lord Lieutenant of Suffolk – 16 April 2026
- Sir Alastair King, KStJ, DL – to be Lord-Lieutenant of Greater London – 13 July 2026
- Nicholas Charrington, DL – to be Lord-Lieutenant of the County of Essex – 17 July 2026
- William James Baxter, QPM, DL – to be Lord-Lieutenant of County Tyrone – 15 October 2026

== Privy Counsellor ==
- The Honourable Dame Sara Cockerill, DBE, KC – 11 March 2026
- The Honourable Sir David Foxton, KC – 11 March 2026
- The Honourable Sir Robert Miles, KC – 11 March 2026
- The Honourable Dame Amanda Yip, DBE, KC – 11 March 2026
- The Honourable Lord Arthurson, KC – 4 June 2026
- Lucy Rigby, KC, MP – 10 June 2026
- Rhun ap Iorwerth, MS – 10 June 2026
- Major Daniel Jarvis, MBE, MP – 15 June 2026
- The Honourable Lord Braid – 8 July 2026
- Sir Chris Bryant, MP – 22 July 2026
- Miatta Fahnbulleh, MP – 22 July 2026
- The Honourable Hamish Falconer, MP – 22 July 2026
- Anneliese Midgley, MP – 22 July 2026
- Kanishka Narayan, MP – 22 July 2026
- Alexander Norris, MP – 22 July 2026
- Dame Angela Eagle, DBE, MP – 22 July 2026
- The Honourable Stephen Kinnock, MP – 22 July 2026
- Matthew Pennycook, MP – 22 July 2026
- Ruth Charteris, KC – 15 October 2026
- The Honourable Sir Christopher Butcher, KC – 11 November 2026
- The Honourable Dame Denise McBride, DBE, KC – 11 November 2026
- The Honourable Sir Timothy Fancourt, KC – 11 November 2026
- The Honourable Sir Richard Meade, KC – 11 November 2026

== Most Noble Order of the Garter ==
Ribbon bar of the Order of the Garter

=== Knight Companion of the Order of the Garter (KG) ===
- The Right Honourable The Lord Hennessy of Nympsfield, FBA – 23 April 2026
- The Right Honourable The Lord O'Donnell, GCB, HonFBA, FAcSS – 23 April 2026
- The Right Honourable The Lord Burnett of Maldon, PC, DL – 23 April 2026

== Most Ancient and Most Noble Order of the Thistle ==
Ribbon bar of the Order of the Thistle

=== Knight of the Order of the Thistle (KT) ===
- Sir Jim McDonald, GBE, FRSE, FREng, FIET, FInstP – 6 June 2026
- Sir James MacMillan, CBE, FRSE – 6 June 2026

== Most Honourable Order of the Bath ==
Ribbon bar of the Order of the Bath

=== Knight Grand Cross of the Order of the Bath (GCB) ===
Honorary

- His Majesty The Sultan of Oman, GCMG, GCVO – 20 October 2026

== Royal Victorian Order ==
Royal Victorian Order ribbon

=== Knight Commander of the Royal Victorian Order (KCVO) ===
- Major General James Maurice Hannan Bowder, OBE – on relinquishing his appointment of General Officer Commanding London District, and Major General Commanding the Household Division – 19 October 2026

=== Commander of the Royal Victorian Order (CVO) ===
- Richard Alexander Charles Cobbe – Illustrative Artist – 13 February 2026
- His Excellency Sir Christian Philip Hollier Turner, KCMG – Ambassador of the United Kingdom to the United States of America – 30 April 2026
- His Excellency Commander Andrew Peter Murdoch, CMG – Governor of Bermuda – 2 May 2026
- Nigel Robert McEvoy, LVO RVM – Assistant to the Master of the Household, Operations, Royal Household – 18 November 2026
- Richard David Thompson, LVO – Palace Foreman, Buckingham Palace – 18 November 2026

=== Lieutenant of the Royal Victorian Order (LVO) ===
- Margaret Rose Walker, MVO – on relinquishment of the appointment as Housekeeper, Birkhall – 19 January 2026
- Mark Peter Andrews, MVO – For services to The King and Queen – 28 January 2026
- David William Blacks, MVO – Property Information Manager, Privy Purse and Treasurer’s Office – 3 February 2026
- The Reverend Canon Martin Poll – lately Domestic Chaplain to King Charles III – 12 February 2026
- Laura Sullivan – on relinquishment of the appointment as Press Secretary, Private Secretary’s Office – 9 March 2026
- James Paul Roscoe, MVO – lately Deputy Ambassador of the United Kingdom to the United States of America – 30 April 2026
- Bernard Patrick John Flannery, MVO RVM – on retirement as Head Butler to the King – 7 August 2026
- Nicholas Piers Turnbull, MBE QGM – Private Secretary to The Duke of Kent – 14 September 2026

=== Member of the Royal Victorian Order (MVO) ===
- Dr Nathan Ross – on relinquishment of his appointment as Assistant Private Secretary to The King – 5 January 2026
- Senay Bulbul, OBE – Minister Counsellor, British Embassy Washington D.C. – 20 May 2026
- Rachel Hunter – British Embassy Washington D.C. – 20 May 2026
- Judith Louise Muxworthy, MBE – Consul-General, British Embassy Washington D.C. – 20 May 2026
- Eleanor Tankard – Director of Visits, British Embassy Washington D.C. – 30 April 2026
- Oliver Christian – British Trade Commissioner for North America and Consul General to New York – 29 April 2026
- Captain Shiva Rai, Royal Gurkha Rifles – on relinquishment of the role of The King’s Gurkha Orderly Officer – 7 July 2026
- Captain Prithi Chhantyal, The Queen's Gurkha Engineers – on relinquishment of the role of The King’s Gurkha Orderly Officer – 7 July 2026
- Branislav Grac, MVO – Honorary appointed in 2026 to be made Substantive
- Paul David Murray, RVM – on relinquishment of his appointment as Senior Storeman, Master of the Household's Department, Royal Household – 23 October 2026

== Most Excellent Order of the British Empire ==
Ribbon bar of the Order of the British Empire (Civil)

=== Dame Commander of the Order of the British Empire (DBE) ===
Civil

- The Honourable Mrs Justice Catherine Brunner, KC – 2 June 2026
- The Honourable Ms Justice Heather Norton – 2 June 2026
- The Honourable Ms Justice Margaret Obi – 2 June 2026
- The Honourable Mrs Justice Patricia Smyth – 2 June 2026
- Pauline Mary Philip, DBE – 20 July 2026 – Honorary appointed in 2017 to be made Substantive

=== Commander of the Order of the British Empire (CBE) ===
Honorary

- Dr Wendy Reid – Former National Director, Education and Quality and Medical Director, Health Education England. For Services to Health Education.

=== Officer of the Order of the British Empire (OBE) ===
Honorary

- Michael Dreier – Mayor of Paderborn. For Services to UK/Germany Relations.
- Mónica Duwe – Former Chief Executive Officer, HSBC Chile and former Director, British-Chilean Chamber of Commerce. For Services to UK Interests in Chile.
- Shernitta La-Chun Lindsay – Chief Operating Officer, Welsh Government Envoy to the United States. For Services to Business Operations, Diversity and the Promotion of British Interests Overseas.
- Seán Dermot O'Leary – Television and Radio Broadcaster. Patron, Cinemagic Film and Television Festival; Patron, The London Irish Centre; Founder, The Tuskar Trust; and Patron, Coppafeel. For services to Charity.
- Andrés Rozental – President, Rozental & Asociados. For Services to UK/Mexico Relations.
- Julia Schafranek – Director and Owner, Vienna’s English Theatre, Vienna. For Services to UK Theatre and Culture in Austria.
- Shawqi Abdulredha Sultan – Former Secretary General, Oman-British Friendship Association. For Services to UK/Oman Relations.
- Carol Wheeler – Founder Washington Ireland Programme. For Services to Peace and Reconciliation and Leadership Development in Northern Ireland.

=== Member of the Order of the British Empire (MBE) ===
Civil

- Dr. Tala El Samad, MBE – Honorary appointed in 2023 to be made Substantive
- Barry Sweetbaum, MBE – Honorary appointed in 2024 to be made Substantive

Honorary

- Irfan Bakhtiar – Multi-stakeholder Forestry Programme Phase 5 Co-Director, Palladium. For services to UK/Indonesia Relations on Climate and Nature.
- José Luís Benitez Mulero – President International Nightlife Association, Director Institutional Relations, Palladium Group. For Services to British Nationals in Spain.
- Richard Carter – Climate Change Team Leader, Caribbean, British High Commission Bridgetown. For Services to British Foreign Policy and Humanitarian Response in Dominica and the Wider Caribbean.
- Iryna Dubish – Defence Officer, British Embassy Kyiv. For services to British Foreign Policy in Ukraine.
- Gabriel Juan Escarrer Jaune – Chairman, Melia Hotels. For Services to British Nationals in Spain.
- Major (Rtd) Hitman Gurung – Chair Royal Gurkha Rifles Regimental Association, Nepal. For Services to the families of Gurkha Soldiers.
- Manami Yuasa Komai – British Council Regional Arts Director, East Asia. For services to Arts and Cultural Collaborations with Japan and ASEAN.
- Professor Hannah Lessing – Managing Director, National Fund of Austria for Victims of National Socialism. For Services to Holocaust Remembrance and Education.
- Nawroz Mardokhi – Home Office International Operations Programme Adviser, British Consulate General Erbil. For Services to the UK in the Kurdistan Region of Iraq.
- Mohamed Mustafa Mohamed Osman – Former Post Security Manager, British Embassy Khartoum, Sudan. For Services to British Interests Overseas.

== British Empire Medal (BEM) ==
Ribbon bar of the British Empire Medal (Civil)

Civil

- Marije Elisabeth Davidson, BEM – Honorary appointed in 2019 to be made Substantive
- Ashraf Hamido Desouki, BEM – Honorary appointed in 2020 to be made Substantive
- The Reverend Simone Ramacci, BEM – Honorary appointed in 2024 to be made Substantive

== Knight Bachelor ==
Knight Bachelor ribbon

- The Honourable Mr Justice Simon Birt, KC – 2 June 2026
- The Honourable Mr Justice Mark Cawson – 2 June 2026
- The Honourable Mr Justice Jason Coppel, KC – 2 June 2026
- The Honourable Mr Justice Richard Kimblin, KC – 2 June 2026
- The Honourable Mr Justice Gavin Mansfield, KC – 2 June 2026
- The Honourable Mr Justice Paul McLaughlin, KC – 2 June 2026
- The Honourable Mr Justice Neil Moody, KC – 2 June 2026

== Imperial Service Medal ==
Ribbon bar of the Imperial Service Medal

- Appointments 17 February 2026
- Appointments 1 September 2026

== Order of St John ==
Order of St John ribbon

=== Bailiff Grand Cross of the Order of St John (GCStJ) ===
- Sir Andrew John Cash, OBE – 25 February 2026
- John Henry Whitehead, CNZM – 21 April 2026

=== Knight of the Order of St John (KStJ) ===
- Franco Cassar – 25 February 2026
- Victor Clydesdale, MBE – 21 April 2026
- Thomas Morgan Hyers – 21 April 2026
- Michael George More-Molyneux, CVO – 21 April 2026
- Richard James Paskell, MBE – 21 April 2026

=== Dame of the Order of St John (DStJ) ===
- Alderwoman Dame Susan Carol Langley, DBE – 25 February 2026
- Caryn Laura Cox, DL – 25 February 2026
- Dame Jean Lucilla Kekedo, DBE, CSM – 25 February 2026
- The Right Honourable The Countess Howe – 21 April 2026
- Jane Andrea Heath – 21 April 2026
- Lynn Horrocks – 21 April 2026
- Marion Sandra Powell– 21 April 2026

=== Commander of the Order of St John (CStJ) ===
- Margaret Ellen Coleman – 25 February 2026
- Paul Bytheway – 25 February 2026
- David Martin Thomson – 25 February 2026
- Wendy Westwood – 25 February 2026
- Marlene Reid – 25 February 2026
- Dr Arthur Francis Sands – 25 February 2026
- Lee Wing-tak, Patre – 25 February 2026
- Kwan King-Fat, Kaiser – 25 February 2026
- Dr Waleed Shaqoura – 25 February 2026
- Sir Robert William Lowry Scott, KCVO OBE – 25 February 2026
- Shirley Abrathat – 21 April 2026
- Roger David Aksamit – 21 April 2026
- Todd Gifford Ammermann – 21 April 2026
- Mark Thomas Bennett – 21 April 2026
- Stephen Brooks Bodwell – 21 April 2026
- Geoffrey Scott Connor – 21 April 2026
- René Clarke Cooper – 21 April 2026
- Tieman Henry Dippel, Jr – 21 April 2026
- The Right Reverend Charles Andrew Doyle – 21 April 2026
- The Reverend Russell Jones Levenson, Jr – 21 April 2026
- Dr Shawn Christopher Merys – 21 April 2026
- Kevin David Munday – 21 April 2026
- Judith Musallam – 21 April 2026
- Alexandra Mary Nixon – 21 April 2026
- Patricia Tatum Otstott – 21 April 2026
- Alice Douglas Pidgeon – 21 April 2026
- Venerable Michelle Pilet – 21 April 2026
- Corinne Elizabeth Ritsick – 21 April 2026
- Lt Col Christopher Andrew St. Victor-de Pinho – 21 April 2026
- The Reverend Canon Carl Francis Turner – 21 April 2026
- Michael David Yon – 21 April 2026

=== Officer of the Order of St John (OStJ) ===
- Appointments 25 February 2026
- Appointments 21 April 2026

=== Member of the Order of St John (MStJ) ===
- Appointments 25 February 2026
- Appointments 21 April 2026

== King's Commendation for Bravery ==
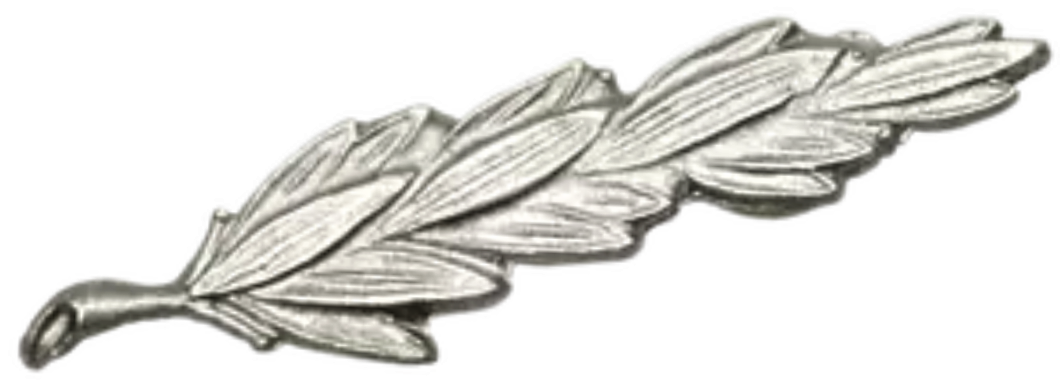
King's Commendation for Bravery

- Folajimi Olubunmi-Adewole – 21 January 2026 (posthumous) – for rescuing a woman from drowning in the River Thames on 24 April 2021
- Joaquin Garcia – 21 January 2026 – for rescuing a woman from drowning in the River Thames on 24 April 2021
- Callum Baker-Osborne – 21 January 2026 (posthumous) – for an attempt to rescue multiple people from drowning at sea in Dorset on 26 July 2021
