= List of courts in Northern Ireland =

== Central courts ==
=== Royal Courts of Justice ===
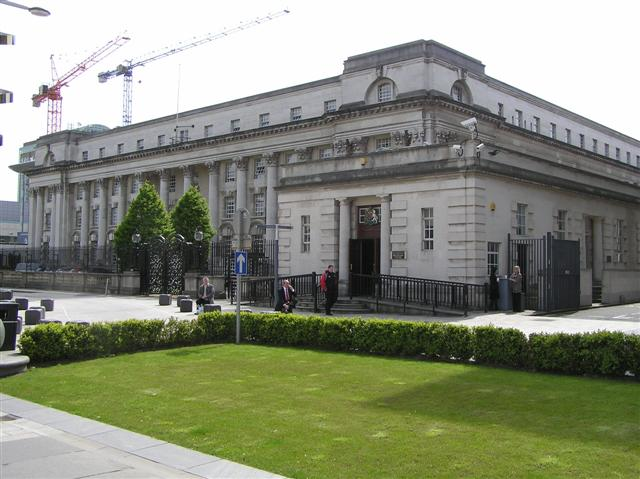
Royal Courts of Justice, Belfast, May 2009

The Royal Courts of Justice are situated in lower Chichester Street, Belfast opposite the Waterfront Hall and beside Laganside Courts. It is the location of the high court and court of appeal of Northern Ireland.

=== Laganside Courts ===
The Laganside Courts are situated in Oxford Street in the centre of Belfast opposite the Waterfront Hall and beside the Royal Courts of Justice. They house the Crown Court, county courts, magistrates' courts, Youth Court, family proceedings courts, the Fixed Penalty Office, Civil Processing Centre and Fine Recovery Team.

== County courts ==
- Antrim Courthouse
- Armagh Courthouse
- Ballymena Courthouse
- Coleraine Courthouse
- Craigavon Courthouse
- Downpatrick Courthouse
- Dungannon Courthouse
- Enniskillen Courthouse
- Limavady Courthouse
- Lisburn Courthouse
- Londonderry Courthouse
- Magherafelt Courthouse
- Newry Courthouse
- Newtownards Courthouse
- Omagh Courthouse
- Strabane Courthouse

== See also ==
- Royal Courts of Justice, Belfast
- Lord Chief Justice of Northern Ireland
- List of lords justices of appeal of Northern Ireland
- List of High Court judges of Northern Ireland
- Northern Ireland law
