= Patricia Smyth (judge) =

Northern Irish judge

The Honourable Mrs Justice Smyth

Judge of the High Court of Northern Ireland
- Incumbent
- Assumed office 17 December 2025

Dame Patricia Mary Smyth is a Northern Irish judge. She has served as a high court judge in Northern Ireland since 2025.

== Biography ==
Smyth was a presiding County Court judge and Recorder of Belfast. She was sworn in as a judge in 2010. She presided over the Lyra McKee trial.

On 17 December 2025, she was appointed as a High Court Judge. In the 2026 Special Honours, she received a DBE.

== See also ==
- List of High Court judges of Northern Ireland
