= Sarah Asplin =

British judge (born 1959)

The Right Honourable Lady Justice Asplin DBE
- Royal coat of arms of the United Kingdom

Lady Justice of Appeal
- Incumbent
- Assumed office 2017

Justice of the High Court
- In office 2012–2017

Personal details
- Born: 16 September 1959 (age 66) United Kingdom
- Education: Fitzwilliam College, Cambridge

Dame Sarah Jane Asplin, DBE (born 16 September 1959) is a British judge of the Court of Appeal of England and Wales. She was granted the customary appointment as Dame Commander of the Order of the British Empire on appointment as a High Court judge in 2012, becoming the third woman appointed to the Chancery Division.

== Education ==
Asplin attended Southampton Sixth Form College for Girls and read law at Fitzwilliam College, Cambridge, earning a BA in Law in 1982 (promoted to MA (Cantab) by seniority in 1986). She went on to obtain the degree of BCL at St Edmund Hall, Oxford.

== Legal career ==
Asplin was called to the bar (Gray's Inn) in 1984 and was appointed a Queen's Counsel in 2002. She became the Head of Chambers at 3 Stone Buildings in 2009, and was a deputy High Court Judge until her appointment to the High Court on 1 October 2012 as the Honourable Mrs Justice Asplin. She was the third woman to be assigned to the Chancery Division, after Mary Arden and Sonia Proudman.

On 22 February 2013, she was appointed as Dame Commander of the Order of the British Empire.

She was promoted to the Court of Appeal on 7 October 2017.

In January 2019, Dame Sarah's appointment as Chair of the Church of England's Clergy Discipline Commission was announced. She simultaneously became the President of the Tribunals.

== Personal life ==
In 1986, Asplin married Nicholas A. Sherwin, a solicitor with Clifford Chance, who had been a contemporary at Cambridge.
