= Courts of Northern Ireland =

The courts of Northern Ireland are the civil and criminal courts responsible for the administration of justice in Northern Ireland: they are constituted and governed by the law of Northern Ireland.

Prior to the partition of Ireland, Northern Ireland was part of the courts system of Ireland. After partition, Northern Ireland's courts became separate from the court system of the Republic of Ireland. Northern Ireland continues to have a separate legal system to the rest of the United Kingdom. There are exceptions to that rule, such as in immigration and military law, for which there is a unified judicial system for the whole United Kingdom.

To overcome problems resulting from the intimidation of jurors and witnesses, the right to a jury trial in Northern Ireland was suspended for certain terrorist offences in 1972, and the so-called "Diplock courts" were introduced to try people charged with paramilitary activities. Diplock courts are common in Northern Ireland for crimes connected to terrorism.

Administration of the courts is the responsibility of the Northern Ireland Courts and Tribunals Service.

== Supreme Court of the United Kingdom ==
The Supreme Court of the United Kingdom was created by the Constitutional Reform Act 2005. It took its duties up on 1 October 2009. It is the final court of appeal for cases originating in all parts of the United Kingdom, other than Scottish criminal cases.

The Supreme Court has taken over the appellate jurisdiction formerly vested in the House of Lords.

== Court of Judicature ==
Supreme Court (Northern Ireland) Act 1942 (Note: Section 3(1).)
- Act of Parliament
- Parliament of the United Kingdom
- Long title: An Act to provide for the amendment of enactments relating to the Supreme Court of Northern Ireland to correspond with alterations in county court jurisdiction made by the Parliament of Northern Ireland, and to make further provision as respects rules and orders relating to the said Supreme Court.
- Citation: 6 & 7 Geo. 6. c. 2
- Territorial extent: United Kingdom

Dates
- Royal assent: 17 December 1942
- Commencement: 17 December 1942 (Note: The Acts of Parliament (Commencement) Act 1793.)
- Repealed: 18 April 1979 (Note: The Judicature (Northern Ireland) Act 1978 (Commencement No. 4) Order 1979 (SI 1979/422).)

Other legislation
- Amends: Common Law Procedure Amendment Act (Ireland) 1870; Civil Bill Courts (Ireland) Act 1874; Supreme Court of Judicature Act (Ireland) 1877; Criminal Appeal (Northern Ireland) Act 1930
- Repealed by: Judicature (Northern Ireland) Act 1978

Status: Repealed

Text of statute as originally enacted

The Court of Judicature of Northern Ireland is constituted by the Judicature (Northern Ireland) Act 1978. It is a collective body of the superior courts of Northern Ireland, and consists of the following courts:

- The Court of Appeal in Northern Ireland (Court of Appeal, formally "His Majesty’s Court of Appeal in Northern Ireland")
- The High Court of Justice in Northern Ireland (High Court, formally "His Majesty's High Court of Justice in Northern Ireland")
- The Crown Court

Until 1 October 2009, the name of the court was the Supreme Court of Judicature: this was changed to remove the word 'Supreme' on 1 October 2009 when the relevant provisions of the Constitutional Reform Act 2005 came into force establishing the Supreme Court of the United Kingdom.

=== Court of Appeal ===
The Court of Appeal is the highest court in Northern Ireland. Appeal from the Court of Appeal lies to the Supreme Court of the United Kingdom. The Court of Appeal hears appeals from the Crown Court, High Court, county courts, courts of summary jurisdiction and tribunals.

A Court of Criminal Appeal existed from 1930 to 1978, when its functions were merged into the new general court of appeal.

Case law in the Northern Ireland Court of Appeal has established the principle that appeals "should be whole, rather than fragmented", i.e. not referred from the lower court issue-by-issue. In First4Skills Ltd v Department for Employment and Learning (2011), Mr Justice McCloskey referred to the decisions in Cullen v Chief Constable of the Royal Ulster Constabulary (unreported, 1998) and Re Lemon's Application (unreported,1995) as establishing this principle, ruling it "incumbent on a court of first instance" to determine all the issues before it.

=== High Court ===
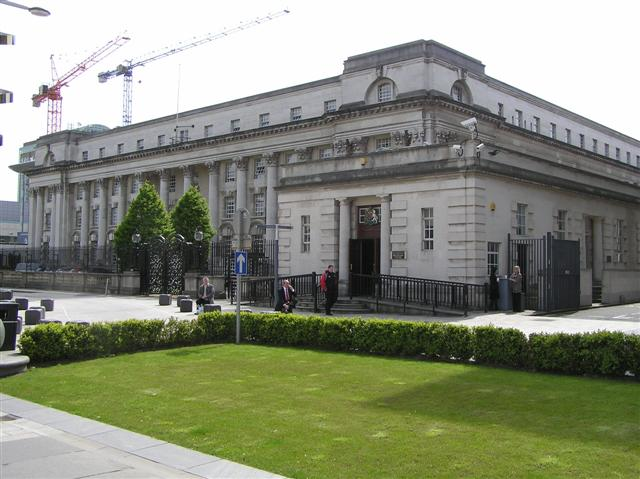
The Royal Courts of Justice, Belfast

The High Court of Northern Ireland is split into three divisions: King's Bench Division, (Note: "NIKB" in court reports, or "NIQB" in relating to the "Queen's Bench Division" during the reign of Queen Elizabeth II.) Family Division and Chancery Division. The High Court is located in the Royal Courts of Justice, Belfast. There is a specialized commercial court track in the King's Bench Division, first established in 1992, known as the Commercial List.

=== Crown Court ===
The Crown Court hears more serious criminal cases. These are indictable offences and "either way" offences which are committed for trial in the Crown Court rather than the magistrates' courts.

== County courts ==
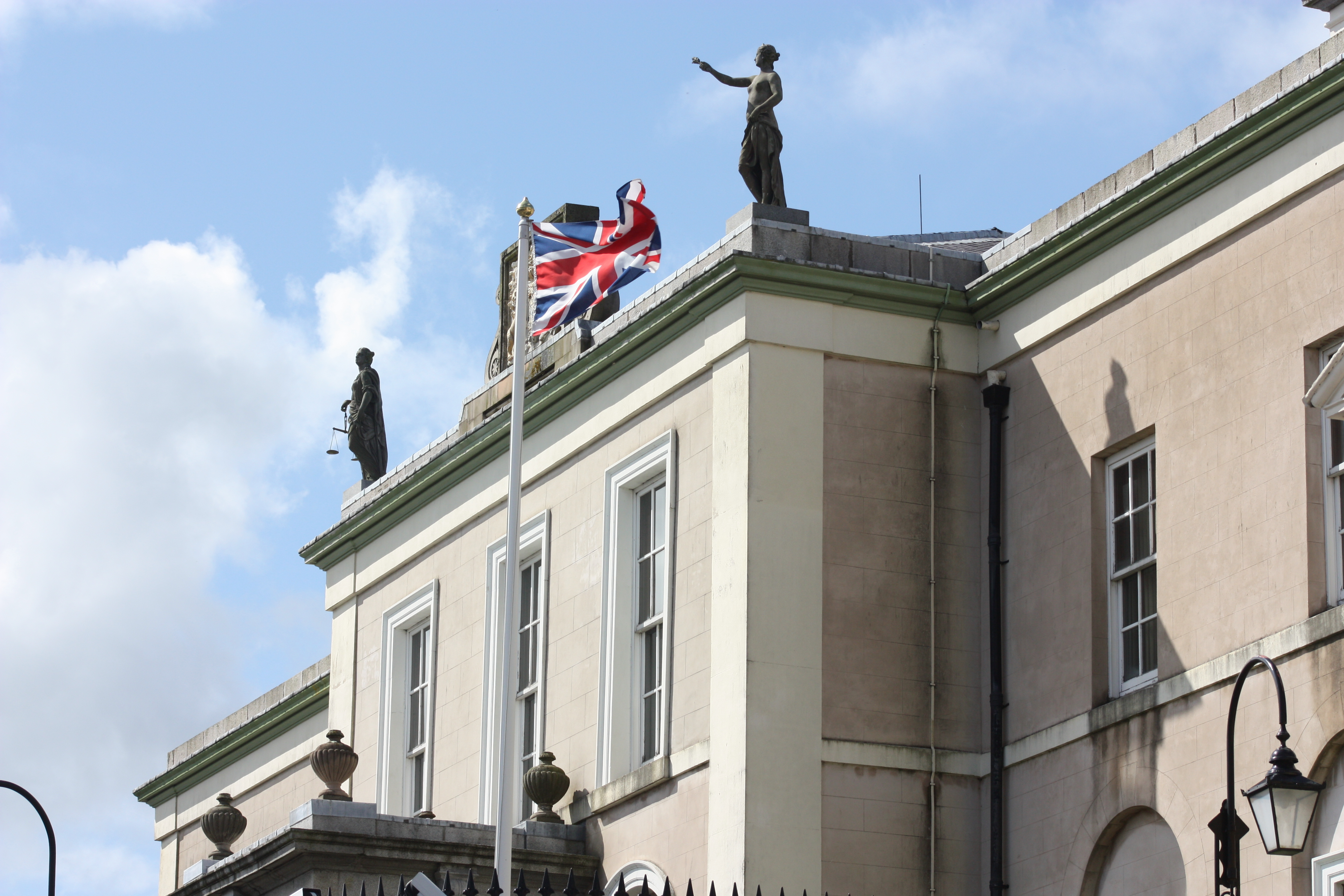
Downpatrick Courthouse, August 2009

The county courts are the main civil courts. While higher-value cases are heard in the High Court, the county courts hear a wide range of civil actions, consumer claims, and appeals from magistrates' courts. The county courts are called family care centres when hearing proceedings brought under the Children (Northern Ireland) Order 1995 and appeals from the family proceedings courts. There were seven county court divisions in Northern Ireland until 2016, when a unified model was adopted.

== Subordinate courts ==
Below the High Court are several classes of courts. Magistrates' courts (including youth courts, family proceedings courts and domestic proceedings courts) hear less-serious criminal cases and conduct preliminary hearings in more serious criminal cases. They are divided into 21 petty sessions districts. The Crown Court hears all serious criminal cases which are committed to trial. When sitting as family proceedings courts the magistrates' courts hear proceedings brought under the Children (Northern Ireland) Order 1995.

Additionally, there is the Enforcement of Judgments Office, and coroners' courts, which investigate the circumstances of sudden, violent or unnatural deaths.

== Court Service ==
The Northern Ireland Courts and Tribunals Service (Irish: Seirbhís Cúirte Thuaisceart Éireann; Ulster-Scots: Norlin Airlan Coort Service) runs the courts of Northern Ireland. It is a court administration agency of the Department of Justice for Northern Ireland. The Court of Judicature for Northern Ireland, county courts, magistrates’ courts, coroners’ courts and certain tribunals are all administered by the Courts and Tribunals Service. The NICTS employs approximately 830 staff members.

Prior to the devolution of justice matters to the Northern Ireland Assembly, the Northern Ireland Court Service was a separate legal entity under the Lord Chancellor, established in 1979 pursuant to Section 69 of the Judicature (Northern Ireland) Act 1978. To facilitate the devolution of justice matters to the Assembly, the Department of Justice for Northern Ireland was created by the Department of Justice Act (Northern Ireland) 2010.

Subsequently, the 'Northern Ireland Court Service' was abolished on the 12 April 2010 by the Northern Ireland Court Service (Abolition and Transfer of Functions) Order (Northern Ireland) 2010 (SR(NI) 2010/133), with the functions of the Northern Ireland Court Service transferred to the Department of Justice for Northern Ireland as per Article 3.

== See also ==
- List of courts in Northern Ireland
- List of lords justices of appeal of Northern Ireland
- List of High Court judges of Northern Ireland
- List of judges of the Supreme Court of the United Kingdom
- Courts of the Republic of Ireland / Judiciary of the Republic of Ireland
- Courts of England and Wales / Judiciary of England and Wales
- Courts of Scotland / Judiciary of Scotland
- Law of the United Kingdom
- List of Government departments and agencies in Northern Ireland
- His Majesty's Courts and Tribunals Service
- Scottish Courts and Tribunals Service
