= Gordon Alchin =

British poet, airman, judge and Liberal Party politician

His Honour Gordon Alchin (January 1894 – 14 May 1947) was a British poet, airman, judge and Liberal Party politician.

== Background ==
Alchin was born the son of Alfred Head Alchin of Rusthall, Kent. He was educated at Tonbridge School and Brasenose College, Oxford. He was a Junior Hulme Scholar, BNC 1913. His education was interrupted by war. After demobilisation in 1919 he returned to his studies at Oxford. In 1920 he was a Senior Hulme Scholar, BCL, MA, Eldon Scholar. In 1924 he married Sylvia Wrensted. They had one son and one daughter. She died in 1939.

== Professional career ==
Alchin served during World War I, from 1914–15, as a Second lieutenant in the Royal Field Artillery at Flanders. In 1915 he joined the Royal Flying Corps and served until 1917 with the Australian Flying Corps. In 1922 he was called to the bar by Middle Temple. As a barrister he practised at Common Law and Commercial Bar until 1940. In 1940 he joined the Royal Air Force Voluntary Reserve. From 1940-45 he served as a County Court judge on Circuit No. 38 Edmonton. In 1945 he served as a County Court judge on Circuit No. 40 Bow until his death.

== Political career ==
Alchin was Liberal candidate for the Tonbridge division of Kent at the 1929 General Election. Tonbridge was a safe Unionist seat where the Liberals had been pushed into third place at the previous general election. He was able to increase the Liberal vote share and win back second place. He did not stand for parliament again.

=== Electoral record ===
General Election 1929: Tonbridge
Party	Candidate	Votes	%	±%
Unionist	Herbert Henry Spender-Clay	19,018	49.8	−8.4
Liberal	Gordon Alchin	10,025	26.2	+6.4
Labour	W F Toynbee	9,149	24.0	+2.0
Majority		8,993	23.6	−12.6
Turnout			72.3	−2.0
Unionist hold		Swing	-7.4	

== Writing ==
Alchin wrote verse and short stories. He was one of the poets who contributed to The Muse in Arms, an anthology of British war poetry published in November 1917 during World War I.

== Prize ==
- After being transferred to the Royal Flying Corps he served in Flanders again and was then awarded He was awarded the Air Force Cross.
