= The Muse in Arms =

1917 anthology of British World War I poetry

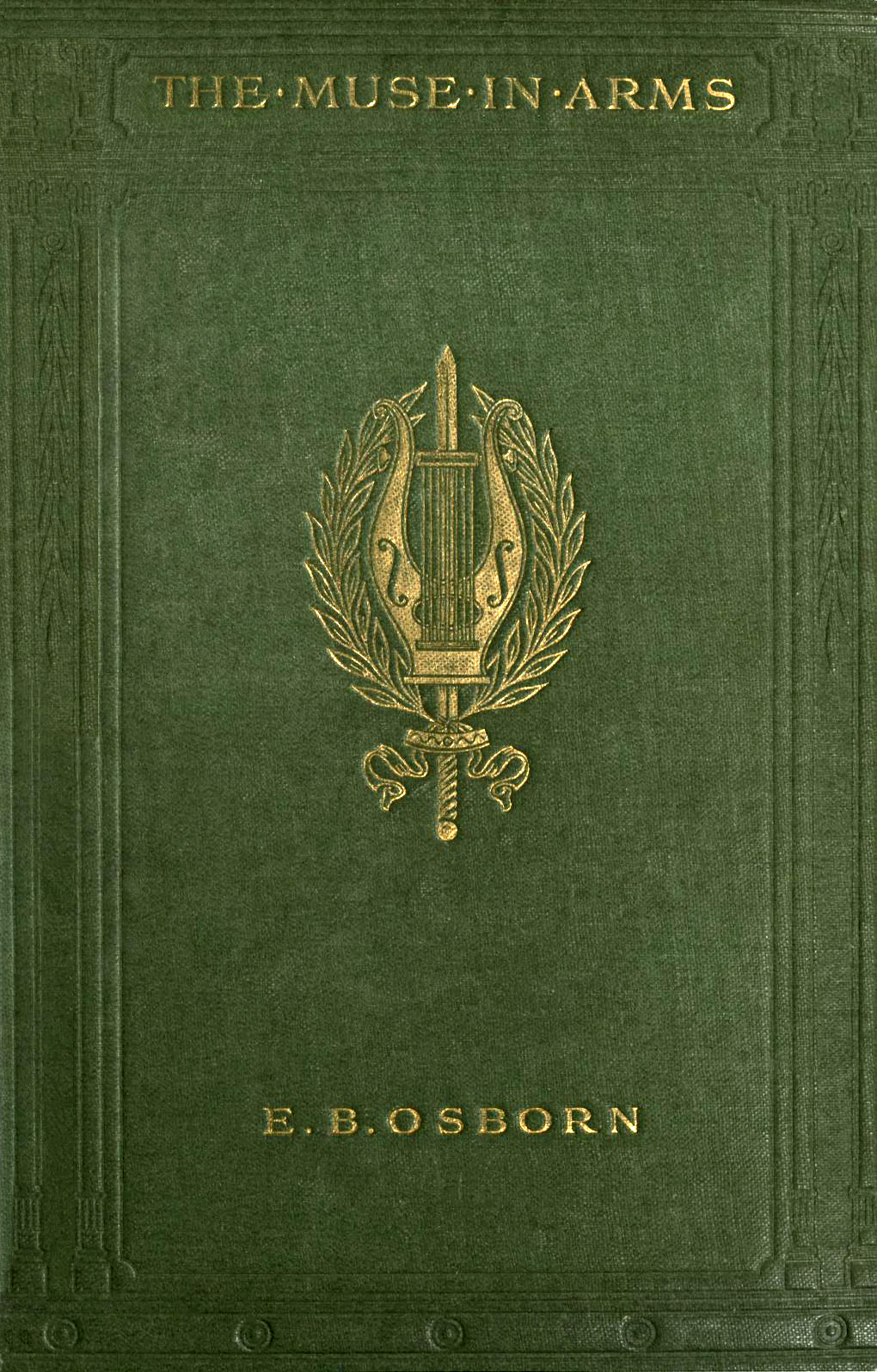
Cover from The Muse in Arms

The Muse in Arms is an anthology of British war poetry published in November 1917 during World War I. It consists of 131 poems by 52 contributors, with the poems divided into fourteen thematic sections. The poets were from all three branches of the armed services, land, sea and air, from a range of ranks (though mostly officers) and from many parts of the UK. Twenty of the poets who contributed to this volume died during the war. The editor was the journalist and author Edward Bolland Osborn (1867–1938), and the book was printed in London by the publishers John Murray. This anthology was one of several collections of war poetry published in the UK during the war. It "achieved large sales", and was reprinted in February 1918. It has been referenced in several analyses of First World War poetry and has been described as "the most celebrated collection of the war years".

== Contents ==
The anthology's title page describes the book as "A collection of war poems, for the most part written in the field of action, by seamen, soldiers, and flying men who are serving, or have served, in the Great War". The dedication is to the journalist and Times Literary Supplement editor Bruce Lyttelton Richmond (1871–1964).

The first edition of the book contains 38 pages of prefatory material including publication details, the dedication, an introduction by the editor, acknowledgments (several of the poems had been previously published), a list of 46 authors, and a list of contents. This is followed by 131 poems over 295 pages. Eight of the 131 poems are by civilian or anonymous authors, some referenced by name or pseudonym and others only by their initials, bringing the total number of contributors to 52.

Osborn's introduction discusses several aspects of the collection and includes a quote from Pericles when considering the cost of the war against the poetry produced:

But the youth we have lost in these dread years has not perished in vain; if "the spring has gone out of the year," as Pericles lamented, yet we are immeasurably the richer for the spirituality they have bequeathed to us, of which the poems in this book are an enduring expression.

— from Osborn's introduction to The Muse in Arms

The book is divided into fourteen thematic sections:

- The Mother Land
- Before Action
- Battle Pieces
- The Sea Affair
- War in the Air
- In Memoriam
- The Future Hope
- The Christian Soldier
- School and College
- Chivalry of Sport
- The Ghostly Company
- Songs
- Loving and Living
- Moods and Memories

== Poets ==
At the time of the anthology's publication in November 1917, the death during the war of sixteen of the forty-six authors was marked in the list of authors with an asterisk, and are so-marked in the following list as well. The deaths during the war of four other authors who were killed or died following publication of the book, or whose deaths had occurred earlier but not been recorded by Osborn, are marked with a double asterisk. The military rank and unit given in the list of authors is also included in the list below.

- Gordon Alchin (1894–1947)
  Captain; RFC and Royal Field Artillery
- Herbert Asquith (1881–1947)
  Lieutenant; Royal Field Artillery
- Rupert Brooke (1887–1915, aged 27) ^{*}
  Sub-Lieutenant; Royal Naval Volunteer Reserve
- Noel M. F. Corbett (1887–1962)
  Lieutenant; Royal Navy
- Leslie Coulson (1889–1916, aged 27)^{*}
  Sergeant; Royal Fusiliers
- Richard M. Dennys (died 1916, aged 32) ^{*}
  Captain; Loyal North Lancashire Regiment
- Gilbert Frankau (1884–1952)
  Captain; Royal Field Artillery
- H. S. Graham (died 1928)
  Captain; Royal Engineers (Fortress)
- Robert Graves (1895–1985)
  Captain; Royal Welsh Fusiliers
- Julian Grenfell (1888–1915, aged 27) ^{*}
  Captain; Royal Dragoons
- Gerald William Grenfell (died 1915, aged 25) ^{*}
  Lieutenant; Rifle Brigade
- Ivor Gurney (1890–1937)
  Private; Gloucestershire Regiment
- F. W. Harvey (1888–1957)
  Lieutenant; Gloucestershire Regiment
- Aubrey Herbert (1880–1923)
  Captain; Irish Guards
- William Hodgson (1893–1916, aged 23) ^{*}
  Lieutenant; Devonshire Regiment
- Geoffrey Howard
  Lieutenant; Royal Fusiliers
- Dyneley Hussey (1893–1972)
  Lieutenant; Lancashire Fusiliers
- Lessel Hutcheon
  Lieutenant; Royal Flying Corps
- Ronald A. Hopwood (1868–1949)
  Captain; Royal Navy
- William M. James (1881–1973)
  Commander; Royal Navy
- A. L. Jenkins (1892–1917, aged 25) ^{**}
  Lieutenant; Duke of Cornwall's Light Infantry
- Joseph Lee (1876–1949)
  Sergeant; Black Watch
- W. H. Littlejohn (died 1917, aged 26) ^{*}
  Company Sergeant Major; Middlesex Regiment
- Patrick MacGill (1889–1963)
  Sergeant; London Irish Rifles
- Harley Matthews (1889–1968)
  Private; Australian Imperial Force
- Charles Scott-Moncrieff (1889–1930)
  Captain; King's Own Scottish Borderers
- E. A. Mackintosh (1893–1917, aged 24) ^{**}
  Lieutenant; Seaforth Highlanders
- Robert Nichols (1893–1944)
  Lieutenant; Royal Field Artillery
- Robert Palmer (died 1916, aged 27) ^{*}
  Captain; Hampshire Regiment
- Victor Perowne
  Lieutenant; Scots Guard
- Colwyn Philipps (died 1915, aged 26) ^{*}
  Captain; Royal Horse Guards
- Max Plowman (1883–1941)
  Second Lieutenant; West Yorkshire Regiment
- A. Victor Ratcliffe (died 1916, aged 29) ^{*}
  Lieutenant; West Yorkshire Regiment
- Alexander Robertson (died 1916, aged 34) ^{*}
  Private; York and Lancaster Regiment
- George U. Robins (died 1915, aged 36) ^{*}
  Captain; East Yorkshire Regiment
- J. M. Rose-Troup
  Captain; Queen's Regiment
- Siegfried Sassoon (1886–1967)
  Lieutenant; Royal Welsh Fusiliers
- Edward Shanks (1892–1953)
  Second Lieutenant; South Lancashire Regiment
- Osbert Sitwell (1892–1969)
  Captain; Grenadier Guards
- Charles H. Sorley (1895–1915, aged 20)^{*}
  Captain; Suffolk Regiment
- R. W. Sterling (died 1915, aged 21) ^{*}
  Lieutenant; Royal Scots Fusiliers
- John W. Streets (died 1916, aged 31) ^{**}
  Sergeant; York and Lancaster Regiment
- Edward W. Tennant (1897–1916, aged 19)^{*}
  Lieutenant; Grenadier Guards
- Willoughby Weaving (1885–1977)
  Lieutenant; Royal Irish Rifles
- Eric F. Wilkinson (died 1917, aged 26) ^{**}
  Lieutenant; West Yorkshire Regiment
- Cyril W. Winterbotham (died 1916) ^{*}
  Lieutenant; Gloucestershire Regiment

Gallery

Selection of photographs of some of the poets and titles of their poems from The Muse in Arms:

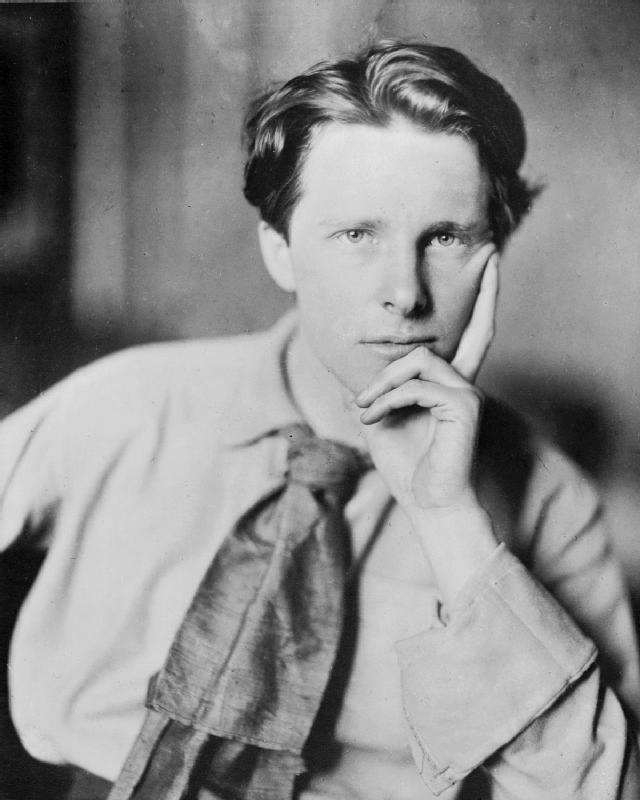
Rupert Brooke:
'If I Should Die'
'Gifts of the Dead'

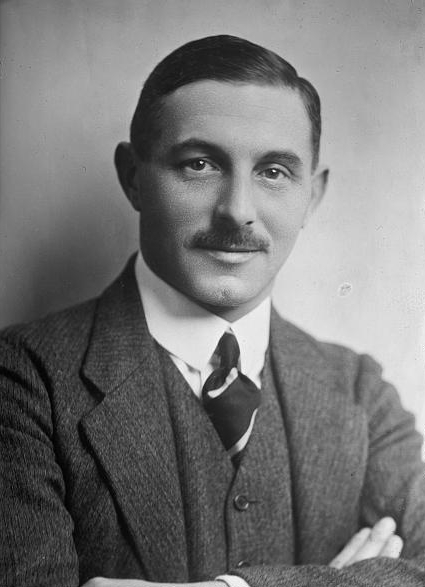
Gilbert Frankau:
'Eyes in the Air'

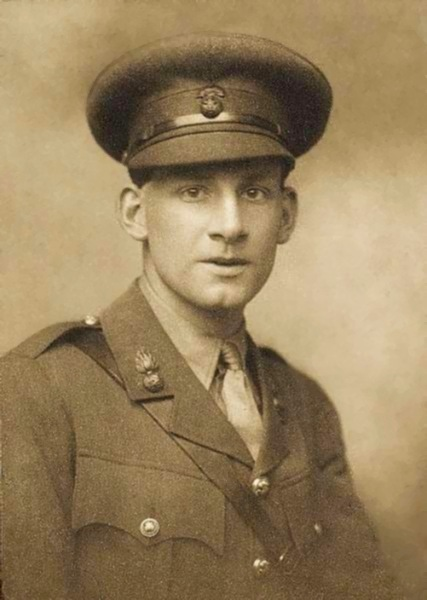
Siegfried Sassoon:
'Absolution'
'The Rear-Guard'

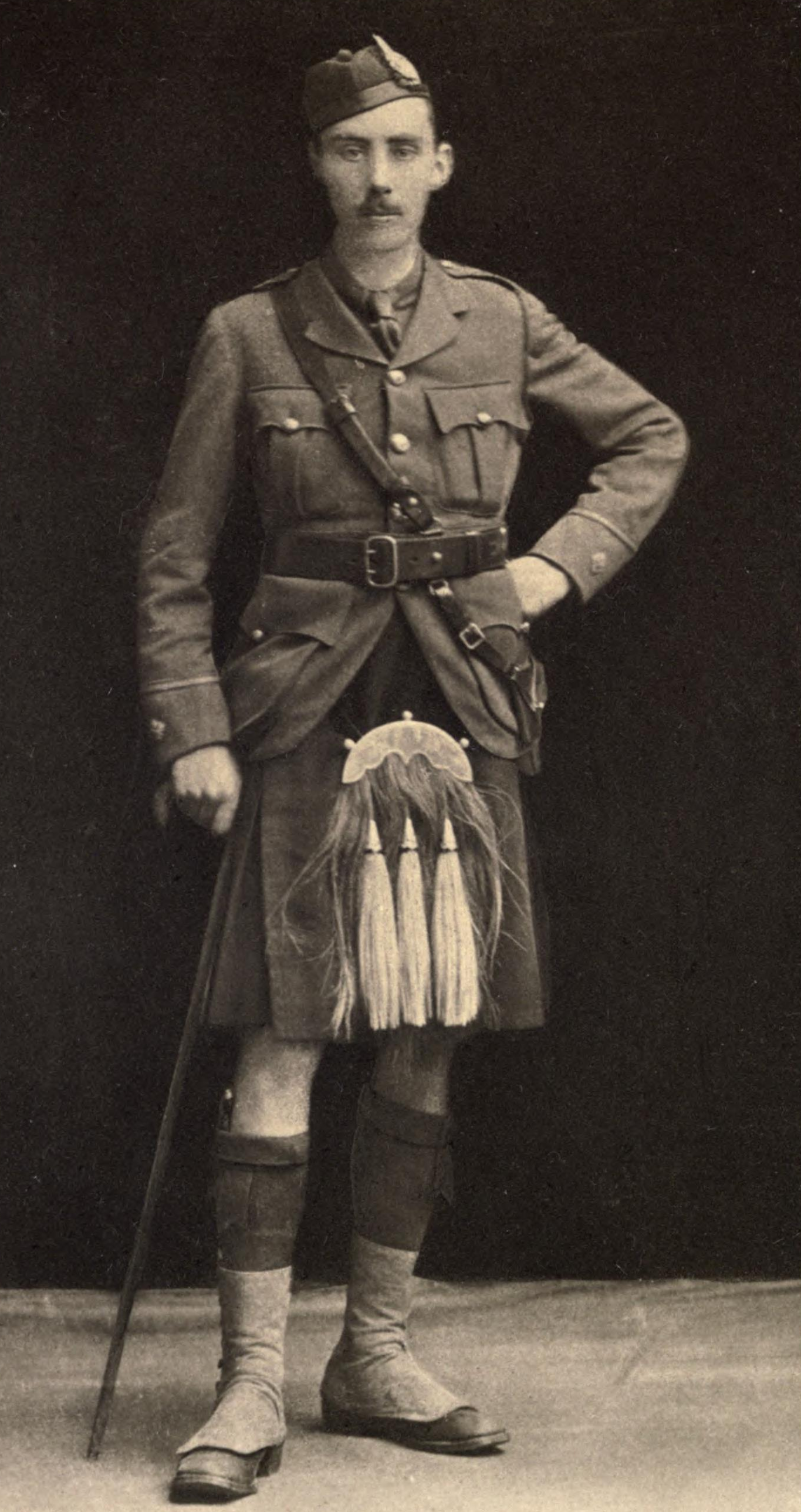
Ewart Alan Mackintosh:
'Cha Till MacCruimein'

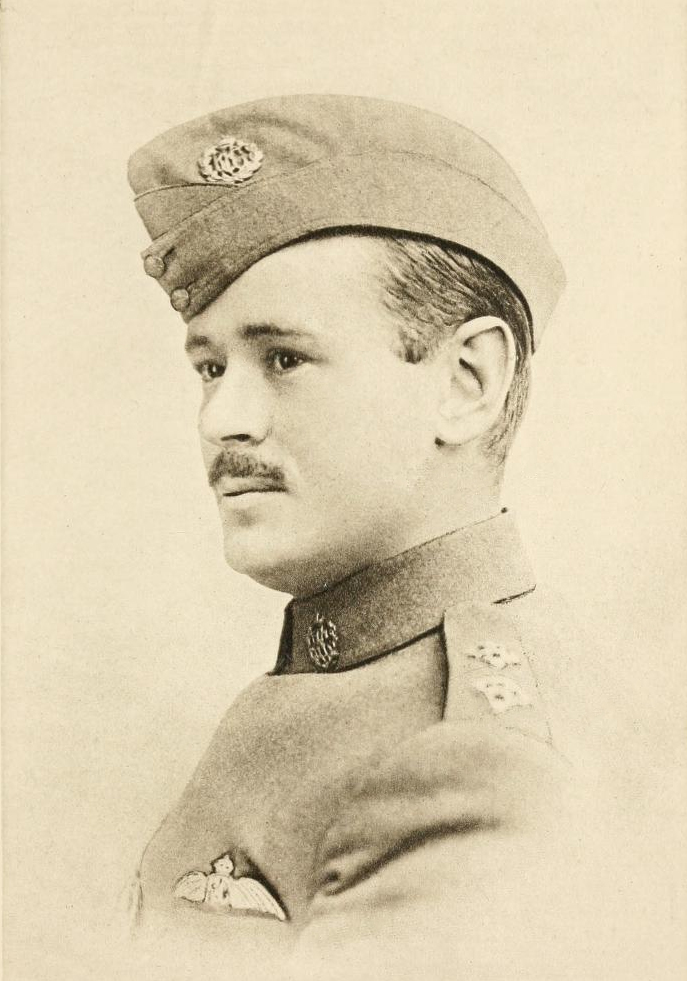
Arthur Lewis Jenkins:
'Spirit of Womanhood'

== Poetry ==
The poems that mention wartime places, battles, people and events include:

- poem V: 'Home Thoughts in Laventie', by E. Wyndham Tennant – refers to Laventie
- poem XVIII: 'In the Morning' by Patrick McGill – refers to the Battle of Loos
- poem XX: 'The New Aeneid' by Alexander Robertson – refers to the Gallipoli Campaign
- poem XXX: 'The Rear-Guard' by Siegfried Sassoon – refers to the Hindenburg Line
- poem XXXII: 'Song of the White Ensign' by William M. James – refers to six naval actions and campaigns
- poem XXXIII: 'Undying Days' by William M. James – refers to three naval battles of 1 June
- poem XXXVI: 'Battle of the Falkland Isles' by I.C. – refers to the Battle of the Falkland Islands
- poem XXXVIII: 'News of Jutland' by Roma White – refers to the Battle of Jutland
- poem XLIII: 'Per Ardua ad Astra' by Gordon Alchin – title refers to the motto of the Royal Flying Corps
- poem XLVI: 'The Death of the Zeppelin' by O. – refers to the defence mounted against the Zeppelins
- poem XLVII: 'The Last Salute' by Robert Nichols – refers to the death of the Grenfell brothers
- poem XLIX: 'R. B.' by Aubrey Herbert – a tribute to Rupert Brooke
- poem LII: 'Goliath and David' by Robert Graves – a tribute to David Thomas
- poem LIII: 'To R____ at Anzac' by Aubrey Herbert – title refers to ANZAC Cove
- poem LIV: 'To John' by William Grenfell – a tribute to John Neville Manners
- poem LV: 'To C.A.L.' by C.A.A. – a tribute to Charles Alfred Lister
- poem LXXIII: 'Holy Communion Service, Suvla Bay' by W. H. Littlejohn – refers to the Landing at Suvla Bay
- poem LXXVII: 'Domum' by Charles Scott-Moncrieff – refers to the Battle for Hill 60 in the Ypres Salient
- poem XCII: 'Cha Till MacCruimein' by Ewart Alan Mackintosh – refers to the MacCrimmon piping family
- poem CVII: 'Suvla Bay' by W. H. Littlejohn – refers to the Landing at Suvla Bay

Selected quotations

The opening lines of 'To the Poet Before Battle' by Ivor Gurney, who would survive the war:

Now, youth, the hour of thy dread passion comes;
Thy lovely things must all be laid away;
And thou, as others, must face the riven day
Unstirred by rattle of the rolling drums
Or bugles' strident cry. [...]

— 'To the Poet Before Battle', Ivor Gurney

Lines from 'Better Far to Pass Away' by Richard Molesworth Dennys, who was killed during the war:

My day was happy – and perchance
The coming night is full of stars.

— 'Better Far to Pass Away', Richard Molesworth Dennys

== Reception ==
The Muse in Arms has been described as one of several "important anthologies in the canonization of poetic taste", including work by Siegfried Sassoon and Rupert Brooke. While other major war poets such as Wilfred Owen and Isaac Rosenberg are absent from the book, the collection has also been noted for its inclusion of poems by "servicemen who perished during wartime and whose literary output was strictly limited". The collection was published at the point in the war where there was a shift from "patriotism and romanticism" to a more realistic verse that reflected the "brutal reality" of trench warfare, answering "to a public demand, particularly strong during the period of the great battles of 1915–17, for poetry from the trenches". The introduction by Osborn has been described as articulating the "appallingly anachronistic concept of war as a game". In his 2007 work, Sillars draws further attention to the imagery used in the introduction by Osborn, and concludes that The Muse in Arms and similar anthologies of that period of the war used poetry to locate the war "within a spiritual landscape that makes mystical the English countryside by endowing it with heroic virtues". The symbolic meaning of the anthology and the works it contains has also been examined, with Haughton (2007) describing the title of the work as representing a "muse enlisted in the service of the State, Church and British Army".
