= E. B. Osborn =

British journalist, author and editor

Edward Bolland Osborn (1867–1938) was a British journalist, author and editor. Born in London in 1867, Osborn was the first son of Edward Haydon Osborn, an Inspector of Factories. He was educated at Rossall School, before matriculating at Magdalen College, Oxford, where he studied mathematics.

Osborn worked for a period under W. E. Henley on the National Observer, alongside J. M. Barrie and H. G. Wells. In 1895, owing to ill-health, he travelled to Canada for a year's holiday, but ended up staying until 1900. During this time, he made a special study of Canadian history and development, publishing Greater Canada in 1900, whilst also writing occasionally for The Times and other British journals.

The majority of Osborn's journalistic career was spent as literary editor of The Morning Post, which was later absorbed by The Daily Telegraph. He remained an employee of the combined newspaper for the rest of his life.

In addition to his newspaper work, Osborn was also an accomplished author, writing books on a wide range of subjects, including Greek and Roman civilisation and the Middle Ages. He was the editor of the highly successful anthology of British war poetry The Muse in Arms, described as "the most celebrated collection of the war years."

Twice married, Osborn had two sons and two daughters. He died on 8 October 1938 in Ealing, West London.

== Bibliography ==
- Greater Canada: The Past, Present and Future of the Canadian North-West (1900)
- The Maid with Wings: And Other Fantasies, Grave to Gay (1917)
- The Muse in Arms (1917)
- The New Elizabethans, a First Selection of the Lives of Young Men Who Have Fallen in the Great War (1919)
- Our Debt to Greece and Rome (1924)
- The Middle Ages (1928)
