= Thomas Meade =

British epidemiologist (1936–2022)

Thomas Meade CBE, FRS, FRCP
- Born: Thomas Wilson Meade; 21 January 1936; Oxford, England
- Died: 24 October 2022 (aged 86); Highgate, London, England
- Education: Christ Church, Oxford; St Bartholomew's Hospital
- Spouse: Elizabeth Meade (née Perks)
- Children: Richard David Meade, Helen Anna Meade, Rebecca Meade.
- Parent(s): James Edward Meade, Margaret Elizabeth Meade (née Wilson).
- Awards: Balzan Prize for Epidemiology

Thomas Wilson Meade CBE FRS FRCP (21 January 1936 – 24 October 2022) was a British epidemiologist. He was a pioneer in epidemiology—in particular, in the role blood clotting factors have in cardiovascular disease.

== Life and career ==
Meade was born in Oxford, England on 21 January 1936. In 1949, Meade earnt a scholarship at Westminster School. He underwent medical training at Christ Church, Oxford, and afterwards at St Bartholomew's Hospital, qualifying in 1960.

In 1970, after a period studying at the Schieffelin Leprosy Research Sanatorium in South India, he became Director of the Medical Research Council's Epidemiology and Medical Care Unit. He retired from there in 2001, and became Emeritus Professor of Epidemiology at the London School of Hygiene & Tropical Medicine, investigating cardiovascular disease.

He held Honorary Consultant positions in Epidemiology at St Bartholomew's, and at Northwick Park Hospital.

Meade was made a Commander of the Order of the British Empire (CBE) in the 1994 Birthday Honours "For services to Medicine and to Science", elected a Fellow of the Royal Society in 1996 and received the Balzan Prize for epidemiology in 1997. In 1998, he was an inaugural Fellow of the Academy of Medical Sciences.

He was a Quaker, attending Hampstead Friends Meeting. He had a son and two daughters, and eight grandchildren. Meade's son, Sir Richard Meade, was appointed a High Court judge in 2020. One of his daughters runs the Railway Land Wildlife Trust in Lewes, Sussex, the other is a NHS medical doctor in London.

Meade died from a lower respiratory tract infection and small vessel cerebrovascular disease at his flat in Highgate, London, on 24 October 2022, aged 86.
