= James Grey West =

British architect (1885–1951)

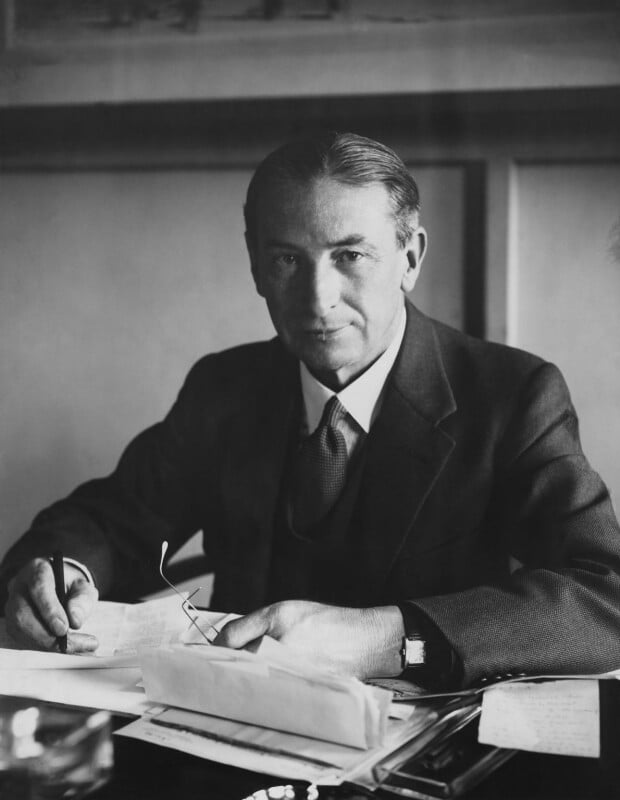
West in 1943

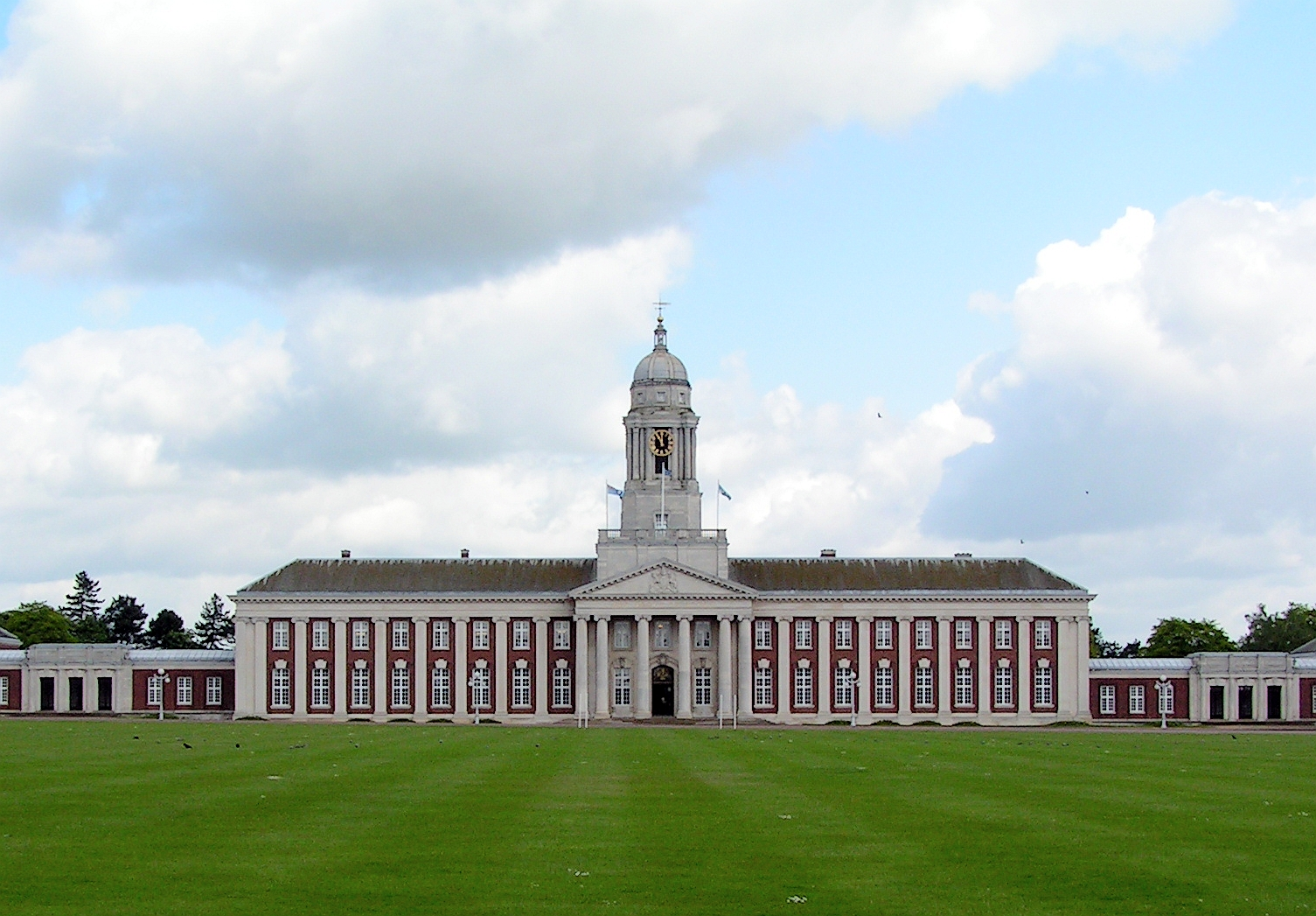
Royal Air Force College, Cranwell, designed by West and completed in 1933

Sir James Grey West OBE (1885 – 15 June 1951) was a British architect. Born and trained in Cardiff, Wales, West joined the government Office of Works in 1904, eventually succeeding Sir Richard Allison as chief architect in 1934.

West worked on Bromyard House, the former Ministry of Pensions building in Acton, London (1914–1922), said to be the largest single building in Britain at the time. He designed the hall of Royal Air Force College at Cranwell, Lincolnshire (1929–1933) in the seventeenth-century style of Sir Christopher Wren. West also worked on the Duveen Wing of the National Portrait Gallery (1933), with Allison, and also provided designs for the Royal Courts of Justice, Belfast (1933). As chief architect, he oversaw the building of Thomas Tait's St. Andrew's House in Edinburgh (1935–39). He was knighted in 1936. During the Second World War, West was appointed Director of Post-War Planning, as well as being chief architect of the reorganised Ministry of Works, until his retirement in 1945.
