= Geological Museum =

Former science museum in London, England

Coordinates: 51°29′47″N 0°10′36″W

The Geological Museum (originally the Museum of Economic Geology then the Museum of Practical Geology) was a museum of geology in London. It started in 1835, making it one of the oldest public single science collections in the world. It transferred from Jermyn Street to Exhibition Road, South Kensington in 1935, moving into a building designed by Sir Richard Allison and John Hatton Markham of the Office of Works next door to the Natural History Museum - it now forms part of that museum.

== History ==
=== Origins ===
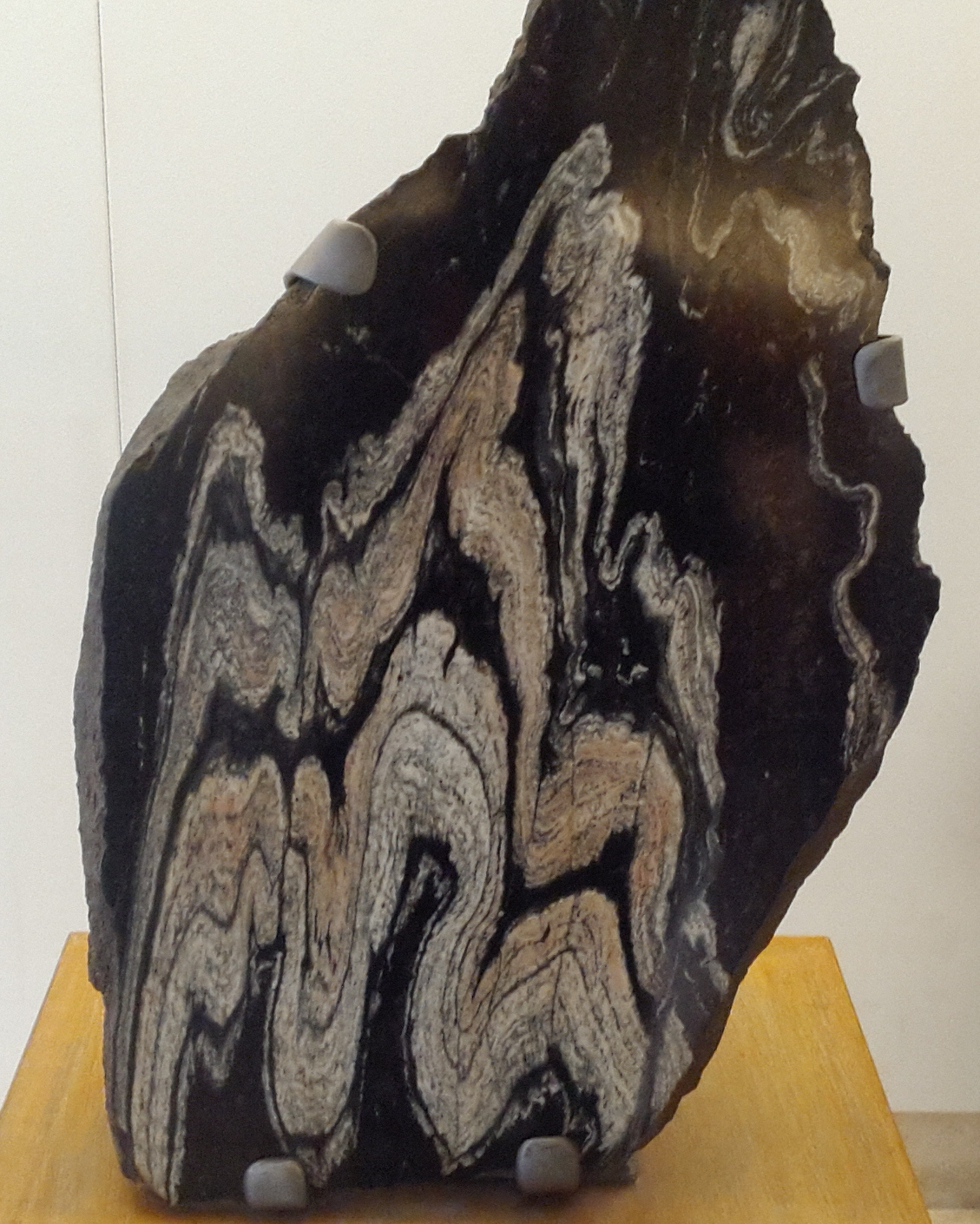
Folded gneiss from Loch Duich, Lasting Impressions gallery, Natural History Museum, London

The Museum of Economic Geology was established in 1837 in a building at 6 Craig's Court, Whitehall, at the suggestion of Henry de la Beche, the first director general of the Geological Survey. The museum's library was founded by de la Beche in 1843, mainly by donation from his own library. Initially under the Ordnance Survey, the museum administration moved to the Department of Woods and Forests in 1845.

Larger premises soon became necessary, and a design for a new building, the Museum of Practical Geology, was commissioned from James Pennethorne. Built on a long narrow site with frontages in Piccadilly and Jermyn Street, that building housed the galleries, as well as a library, a 500-seat lecture theatre, offices and laboratories. It was constructed between 1845 and 1849, and was opened by Prince Albert on May 14, 1851.

The purpose of the museum, as summarised in the Descriptive Guide, published in 1867, was:

to exhibit the rocks minerals, and organic remains, illustrating the maps and sections of the Geological Survey of the United Kingdom: also to exemplify the applications of the Mineral productions of these Islands to the uses of purposes of use and ornament

The collections were accordingly arranged in two main sections covering natural materials found in the United Kingdom, and industrial products made from them. There were three secondary sections, covering mechanical appliances used to process raw materials, specimens of historical products, and foreign materials imported in their raw state. The museum also included maps, mosaics, glass, pottery, and busts of prominent geologists and scientists, including William Smith and James Hall, though in 1901 over 2,700 decorative arts and archaeological items such as glassware and ceramics were transferred to the Victoria and Albert Museum.

=== Exhibition Road ===
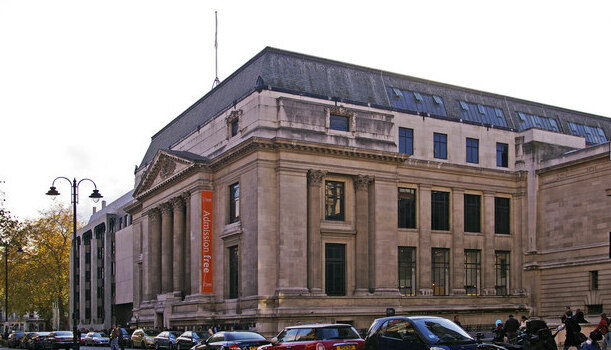
The building of the Geological Museum from 1935, designed by Sir Richard Allison and John Hatton Markham

The museum was reopened by the then Duke of York in July 1935, after the completion of the new building on Exhibition Road in South Kensington two years prior - it had housed the ill-starred World Economic Conference in June 1933, which had brought together the representatives of 66 nations in a failed effort to end the then-prevalent global depression. The cost of the new building was stated at around £220,000 by the First Commissioner of Works. Following the move, the museum became well known for the many dioramas (three-dimensional paintings) used to interpret geology and one or two mining techniques. These have largely been dismantled since the Natural History Museum took over the museum in 1986.

In 1965, the museum was merged with the British Geological Survey and Overseas Geological Surveys, under the name "Institute of Geological Sciences". In 1971 the museum employed the late designer James Gardner to design and produce The Story of the Earth, which was acknowledged as a significant breakthrough in science museum design and critically acclaimed and imitated worldwide. It was opened by Queen Elizabeth II and became well known for the huge reproduction of a rock face, cast from site in Scotland, and for its planetarium, active volcano model and earthquake machine.

Between 1971 and 1974 the museum formed its own design team which, working closely with the scientists and technicians, produced a series of temporary and permanent exhibitions starting with the re-presentation of the gem collection and then, with a design team led by Giles Velarde (Head of Exhibition Design from 1974 to 1988), produced Early Days of Geology in Britain, Black Gold, Britain Before Man, Journey to the Planets, British Fossils, Pebbles, Treasures of the Earth and finally British Offshore Oil and Gas, which opened in 1988.

Treasures of the Earth was the first major museum gallery in the world to integrate computers presenting images and text adjacent to artefacts as part of the information process within the exhibition. The central feature film, Liquid Assets, in the Oil and Gas exhibition was shot and viewed vertically from a circular gallery and won a major award from the IVCA in 1989.

"The Power Within" exhibition on seismology includes a reconstruction of the 1995 Kobe earthquake.

=== Transfer and new displays ===
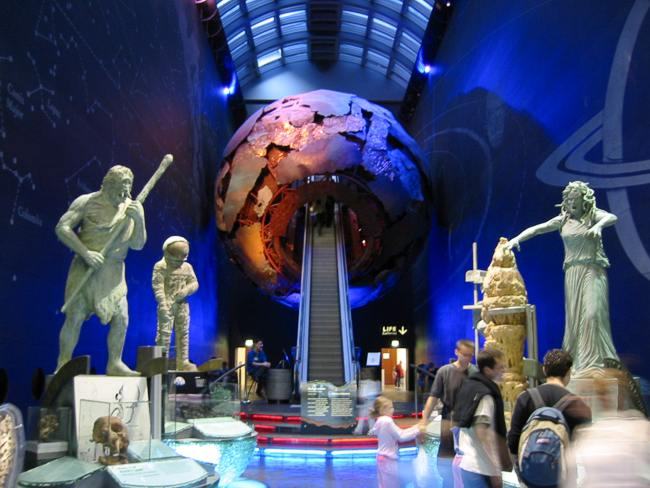
The former atrium of the Geological Museum as it appeared until 2014

Following the relocation of the British Geological Survey's academic activities to Keyworth, the museum galleries (renamed The Earth Galleries) and the majority of its collections were transferred from the custody of the Natural Environment Research Council to the newly independent Natural History Museum (NHM) by 1985. Renamed as Visions of the Earth, the Central Hall of the former Museum was transformed in 1996 to a design by Neal Potter. This included the installation of a large escalator (rising eleven metres at a 30° slope) that ascends continuously over two storeys and passes through a model globe. That globe rotated around the escalator, with dramatic sound effects based on Jimi Hendrix's "Third Stone from the Sun", attempting to give an impression of the flux in the core of the Earth.

The escalator was a response to survey feedback that few visitors navigated the Geological Museum's monumental staircase to the top floors. Potter's major re-ordering of the galleries means that visitors are now encouraged to start their visit at the top of the building by ascending an escalator as part of the visit itinerary.

The spinning globe in 1996

The previously open-sided balconies of the atrium space are now solid walls lined with slabs of recycled slate. These are sand-blasted to show the major stars in the night sky and the planets in the Solar System. The Museums Association's journal Museum Practice reported in 2007 that "the contrast between galleries just before and just after Potter’s arrival [at the NHM] is like switching over from a television programme made for schools to a big-screen epic, choreographed by Busby Berkeley." However, it was not until 1998 that the previously difficult to find corridor between what had been the NHM and Geological Museum buildings was replaced by a new link gallery.

The former Geological Museum galleries are now known as the Red Zone in the NHM's plans and internal directional signage. In 2014 the displays in the centre of the atrium were removed and replaced by an original skeleton of a stegosaurus on open display. The following year a new human evolution gallery was opened

== See also ==
- Museum Lane to the north
- Simpsons of Piccadilly
