= Tieman H. Dippel Jr. =

American civic leader, businessman (born 1945)

Tieman H. Dippel Jr. CStJ
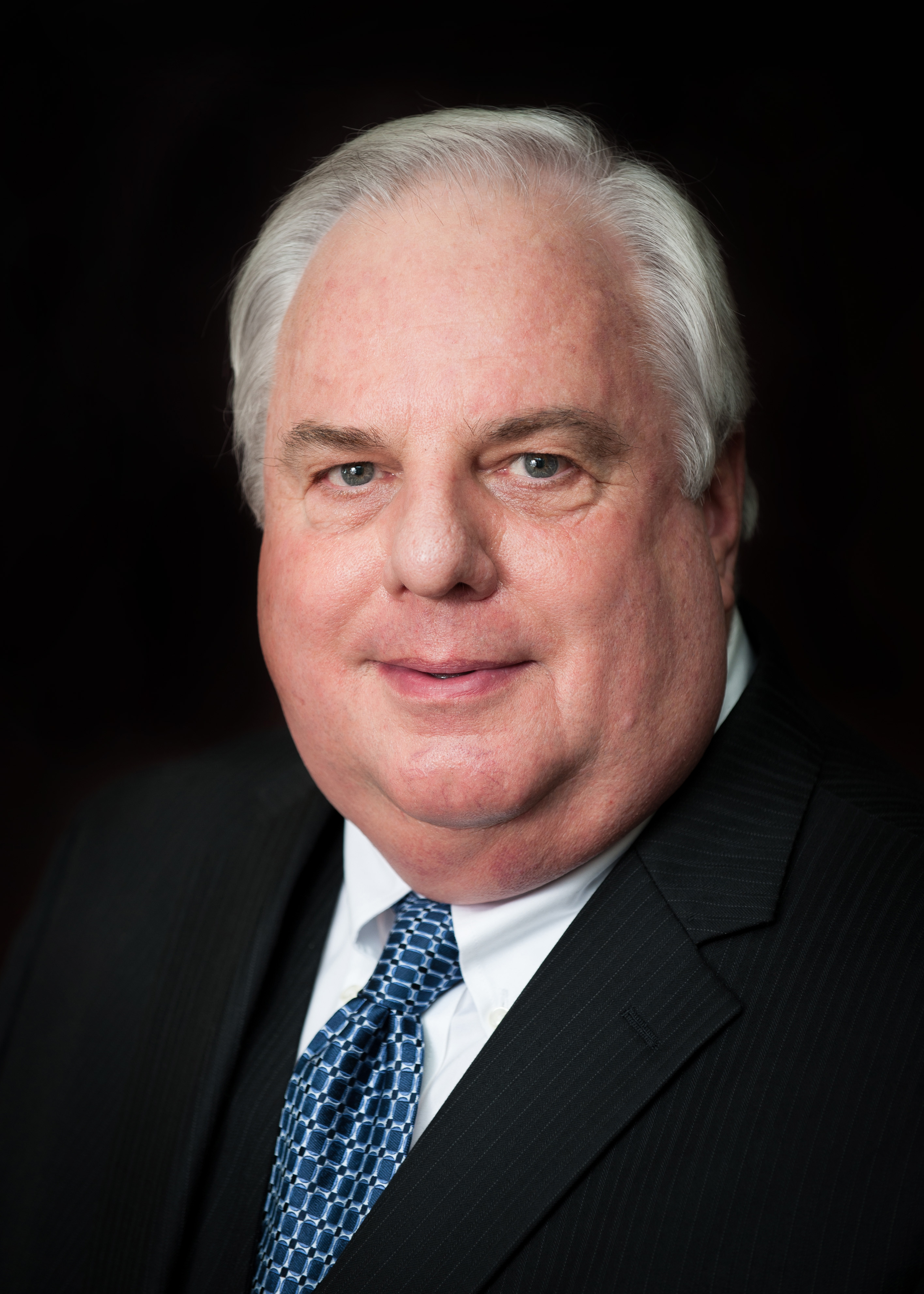
- Born: 1945 (age 80–81); Brenham, Texas, U.S.
- Other name: Skipper Dippel
- Education: Blinn College (AA); University of Texas School of Law (JD)
- Occupations: Businessman, author
- Years active: 1972–present
- Known for: The Language of Conscience series

Tieman H. Dippel Jr. (born 1945) is an American civic leader, businessman, attorney, and author. He has served in the University of Texas system, the Texas Chamber of Commerce, Blue Cross Blue Shield, as director in the Federal Reserve Bank of Dallas, and many other institutions; in addition to founding the Texas Lyceum. He is known for his book series and philosophic concept, The Language of Conscience, published between 1987 and 2012.

== Early life and education ==
Dippel was born in Brenham, Texas. His father was a Washington County sheriff, and his mother was a local civic activist. He graduated from the University of Texas in Austin's McCombs School of Business in 1968, with a bachelor's degree in business administration. He also holds an Associate of Arts degree from Blinn College and a Juris Doctor from the University of Texas School of Law.

== Career ==
After graduating from college, Dippel enlisted in the U.S. Navy for several years, where he achieved the rank of lieutenant commander in the Navy Reserve. In March 1972 he began to serve as president at the Farmers National Bank (later Brenham Bancshares) in Brenham, Texas.

In the 1980s, he served as the chairman of Texans for Quality Education, and lobbied the Texas Legislature on behalf of the Texas Commission on the Arts and Humanities, to more than double funding for the arts. He was president of the East Texas Chamber of Commerce, before becoming president of the Texas State Chamber of Commerce for a year. Dippel also served on the development board of University of Texas Health Science Center, and served on the University of Texas's Centennial Commission (Commission of 125). He was the founding president and chairman of the Texas Lyceum in 1980, whose goal is to "identify and develop the next generation of top leadership in the State of Texas."

In 1989 he became a director at Blue Cross Blue Shield of Texas, where he served as chairman of the finance committee, and from 1992 to 1997 he served as a director at the Federal Reserve Bank of Dallas. In 2014 he was inducted in the Texas Bankers Hall of Fame.

Texas Business magazine named Dippel in 1987 as one of the "20 Most Powerful Texans".

== Publications ==
Dippel has written six books in The Language of Conscience series:

- The New Legacy: Thoughts on Politics, Family, and Power (1987)
- The Language of Conscience: (2003)
- Understanding Enlightened Conservatism (2007)
- Instilling Values in Transcending Generations (2008)
- The Essentials of The Language of Conscience (2010)
- The Wisdom of Generations (2012)

The Wisdom of Generations won a Montaigne Medal Award in 2016; it previously had won the Bronze Award for Philosophy in ForeWord Magazine. The Language of Conscience was translated and published by the Press of the Central Party School of the Chinese Communist Party, as a discussion of Western ethics, morality, and cultural values.

In 2003, the Texas Legislature named Dippel the “Texas Prophet of Conscience” for his publications; the bill was sponsored by House Speaker Republican Tom Craddick, former Democratic Speaker Pete Laney, and others.

In 2011 Dippel received the Cesar Chavez Conscience Builder Award from the Cesar Chavez Legacy and Educational Foundation. Dippel received the Citizen of Conscience Award from the LULAC Texas State Convention in 2013.

== Personal life ==
Dippel lives in Brenham with his wife Katherine. He has three children and eight grandchildren. He was appointed a Commander of the Venerable Order of St. John (CStJ) in May 2026.
