= Eldon Law Scholarship =

Scholarship awarded to students from the University of Oxford

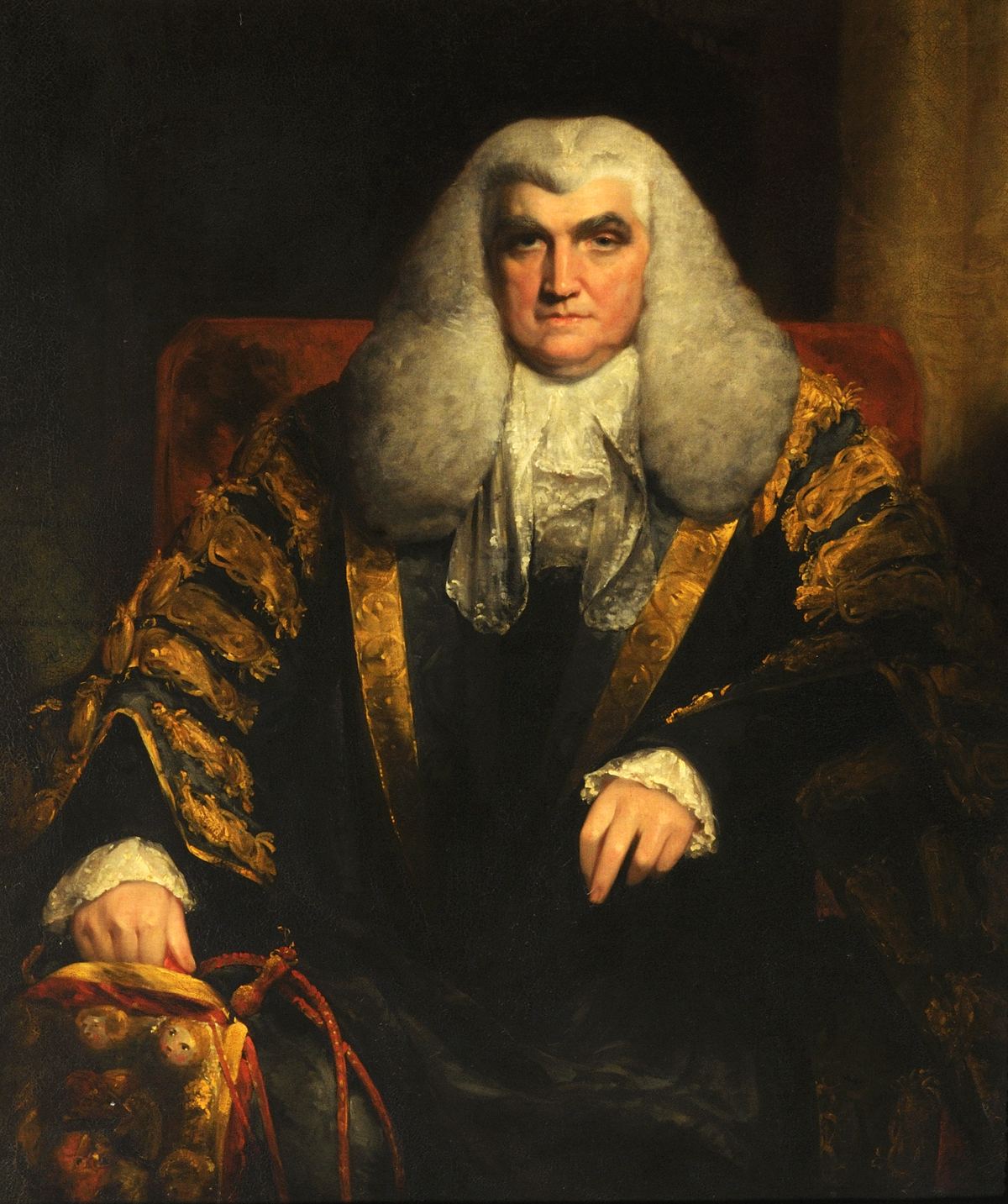
The Earl of Eldon

The Eldon Law Scholarship is a scholarship awarded to students from the University of Oxford who wish to study for the English Bar. Applicants must either have obtained a first class honours degree in the Final Honours School, or obtained a distinction on the BCL or MJur. It is a two-year scholarship presently funded at £9,000 a year.

== History ==
The scholarship dates from 12 May 1830, and was funded in response to an application from subscribers. Although the scholarship is named after Lord Eldon LC, it is not funded from his will; Lord Eldon did not die until eight years after the scholarship was founded. The first trustees included the Duke of Richmond, Earl of Mansfield, Earl of Romney and Lord Arden.

Until 1963 it was a requirement that an applicant be a member of the Church of England. In 1963 that was downgraded to a preference, and in 1983 the requirement was dropped entirely.

== Past winners ==
Past winners include:

- Herman Merivale (1831), civil servant and historian
- Roundell Palmer, 1st Earl of Selborne (1834), Lord Chancellor
- Thomas Henry Haddan (1840), founder of The Guardian
- Edward Karslake (1843), barrister and politician
- Ralph Lingen, 1st Baron Lingen (1846), civil servant
- John Conington (1849), classical scholar (who gave up the scholarship)
- Sir George Osborne Morgan (1851), barrister and politician
- Sir Robert Herbert (1854), first Premier of Queensland, Australia
- Horace Davey, Baron Davey (1859), Law Lord
- Sir Courtenay Ilbert (1867), lawyer and civil servant
- Alfred Barratt (1870), philosopher
- Arthur Godley, 1st Baron Kilbracken (1874), civil servant
- Alfred Milner, 1st Viscount Milner (1878), politician and colonial administrator
- Francis William Pember (1887), lawyer and academic, vice-chancellor of the University of Oxford
- Sir Frederick Liddell, KC (1892), civil servant
- Alfred Hazel MP
- Murray Coutts-Trotter, Chief Justice of Madras High Court
- Sir Arthur Steel-Maitland (1899), politician
- Raymond Asquith (1902), barrister
- Sir John Behan (1906), lawyer and educationist
- Patrick Shaw-Stewart, banker and war poet
- Cyril Asquith, Baron Asquith of Bishopstone (1913), Law Lord
- Professor Sir Carleton Allen, QC (1913), law professor and Warden of Rhodes House
- Sir Geoffrey Faber (1920), academic and publisher
- Gordon Alchin (1920), poet, judge and politician
- Sir Eric Beckett, QC (1921), legal adviser to the Foreign Office
- Tom Denning, Baron Denning (1921), Law Lord and Master of the Rolls
- Cyril Radcliffe, 1st Viscount Radcliffe (1923), Law Lord
- Sir John Foster, QC (1924), politician, army officer and legal scholar
- John Sparrow (1929), academic and barrister, Warden of All Souls
- Richard Wilberforce, Baron Wilberforce (1930), Law Lord
- J.H.C. Morris, QC (1933), academic
- Sir James Fawcett, QC (1935), President of the European Commission for Human Rights
- Sir Thomas Smith, QC (1937), barrister and academic
- Robert Blake, Baron Blake (1938), historian
- Sir Wilfrid Bourne, QC (1948), Permanent Secretary to the Lord Chancellor's Office
- W.A.N. Wells (1949), Australian barrister and judge
- Sir Richard Blackburn (1949), Australian judge
- Sir Anthony Barrowclough, QC (1949), government lawyer
- Sir Christopher Slade (1950), Lord Justice of Appeal
- Patrick Neill, Baron Neill of Bladen, QC (1951), barrister, public servant and Warden of All Souls
- Dick Taverne, Baron Taverne, KC (1952), barrister and politician
- Edward Nugee, QC (1953), barrister
- Tom Bingham, Baron Bingham of Cornhill (1957), Senior Law Lord, Lord Chief Justice and Master of the Rolls
- Sir Christopher Rose (1959), Lord Justice of Appeal
- Richard Mawrey, KC (1964), barrister
- Sir David Keene (1965), Lord Justice of Appeal
- Nicholas Wilson, Lord Wilson of Culworth (1967), Supreme Court judge
- Sir James Munby (1970), President of the Family Division
- Sir Michael Hart (1970), High Court judge
- Dame Sonia Proudman (1973), High Court judge
- Sir Stephen Tomlinson (1974), Lord Justice of Appeal
- Sir Peter Gross (1978), Lord Justice of Appeal
- Sir Paul Walker (1980), High Court judge
- Nicholas Hamblen, Lord Hamblen of Kersey (1982), Justice of the UK Supreme Court
- Sir Christopher Nugee (1984), Lord Justice of Appeal
- Philip Sales, Lord Sales (1986) Justice of the UK Supreme Court
- Sir Christopher Butcher (1987), Lord Justice of Appeal
- Sir David Foxton (1989), Lord Justice of Appeal and former Judge in Charge of the Commercial Court
- Dame Sara Cockerill (1990), Lady Justice of Appeal and former Judge in Charge of the Commercial Court
- Sir Martin Chamberlain (1997), Lord Justice of Appeal
