= Richard Allison (architect) =

Scottish architect

Allison in January 1940.

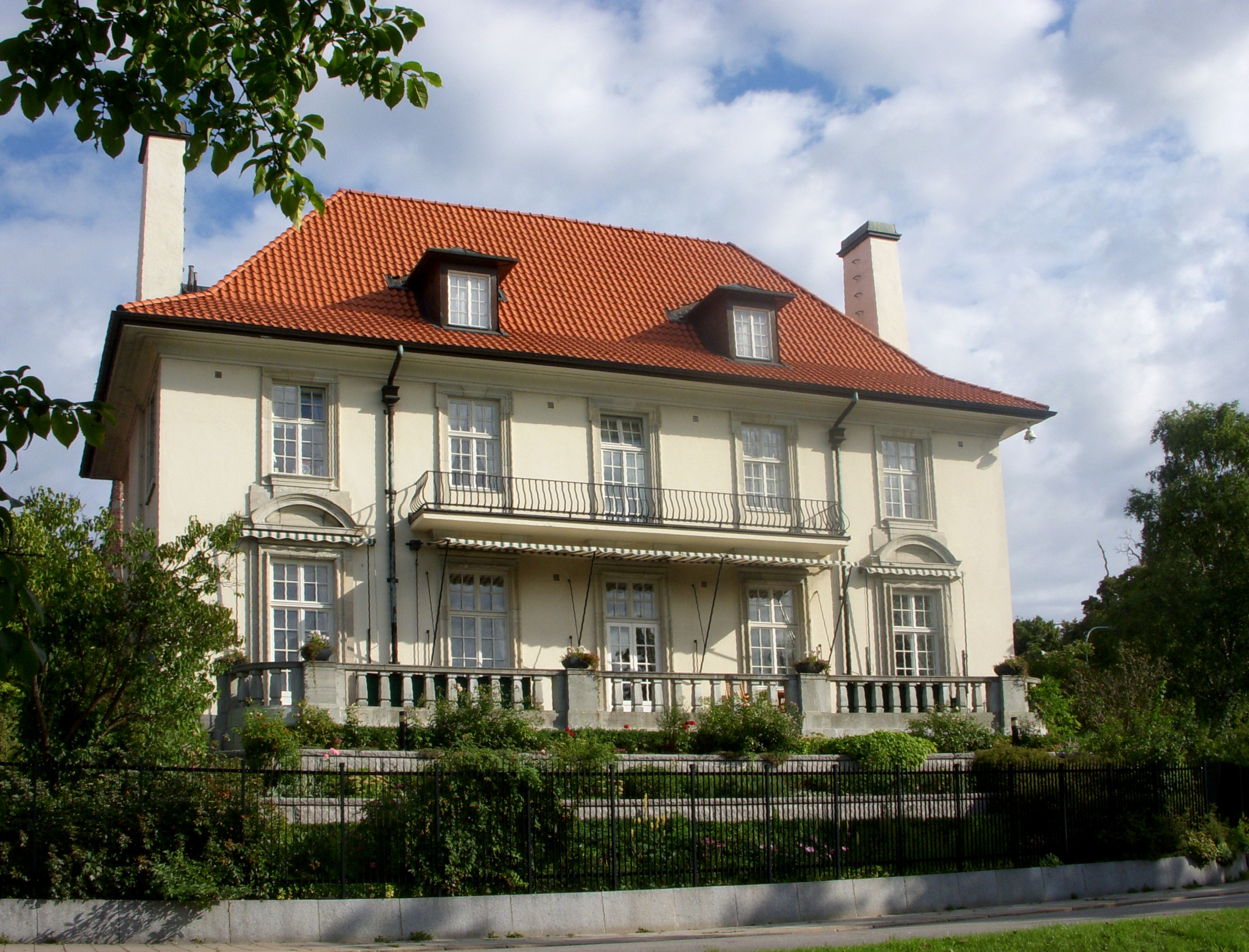
The British chancery in Stockholm

Sir Richard John Allison CVO CBE (1869–1958) was a Scottish architect. From 1889 he was associated with the government Office of Works in London (as example The Science Museum), and from 1914 was its chief architect.

== Selected works ==
- The Science Museum, London (1919–28)
- The Duveen wing, National Portrait Gallery, London (1933), with J G West.
- The Geological Museum, London
- The Royal Courts of Justice, Belfast (1933), with J G West.
- The British Ambassador's house in Diplomatstaden, Stockholm (1915).

== Honours ==
Allison was appointed an Officer of the Order of the British Empire (OBE) in 1918 for his wartime service, and promoted to Commander of the Order (CBE) in 1920, again for wartime service. He was knighted in the 1927 Birthday Honours, and appointed a Commander of the Royal Victorian Order (CVO) in the 1934 New Year Honours.
