= Down County Council =

Local authority, 1899 to 1973

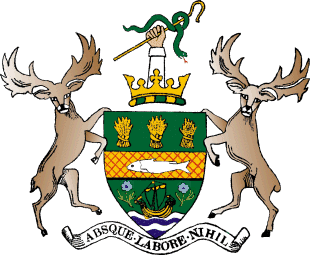

History
- Founded: 1 April 1899
- Disbanded: 1 October 1973
- Succeeded by: Ards Borough Council; Banbridge District Council; Belfast City Council; Castlereagh Borough Council; Craigavon Borough Council; Down District Council; Lisburn City Council; Newry and Mourne District Council; North Down Borough Council

Meeting place
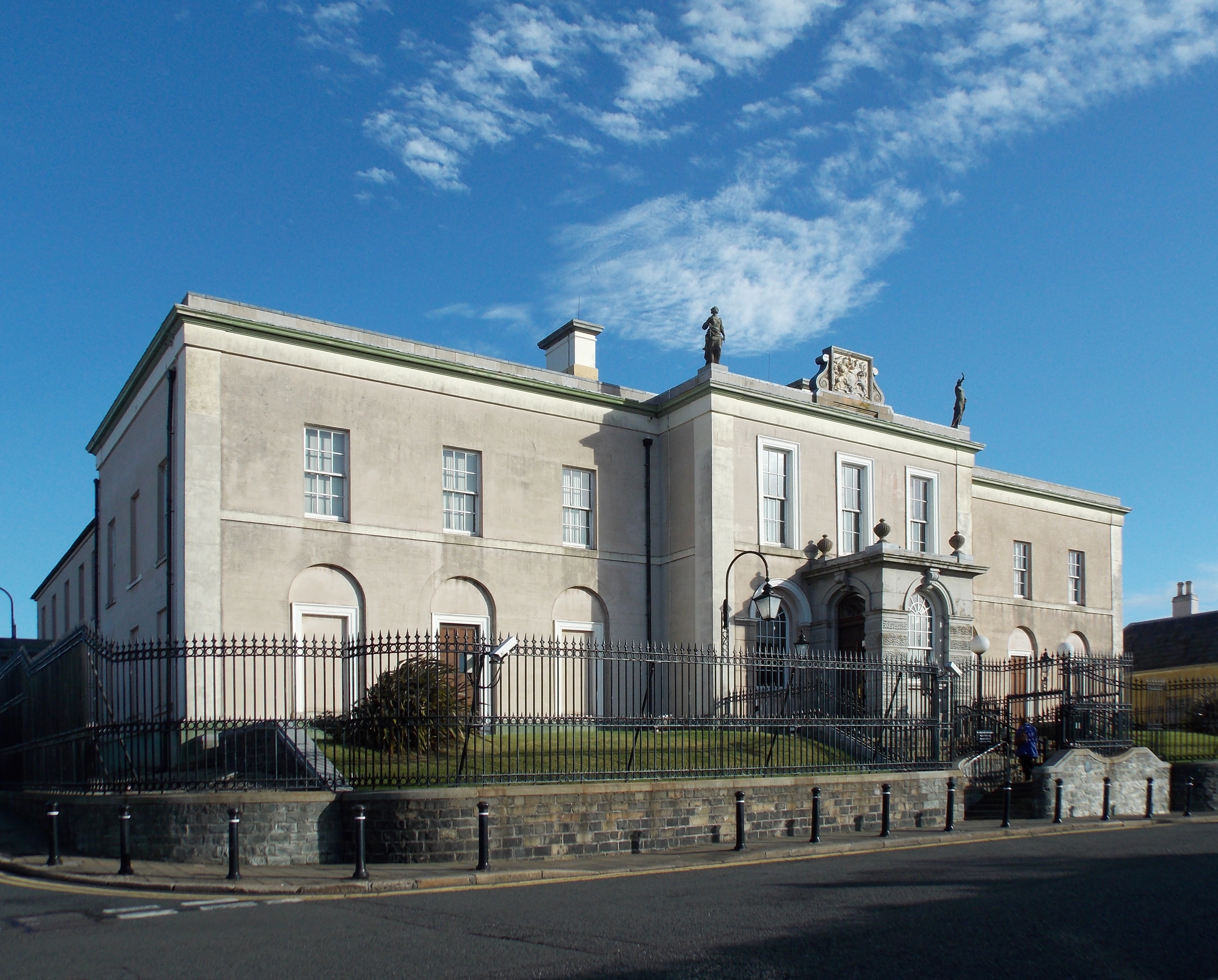
- Downpatrick Courthouse

Down County Council was the authority responsible for local government in County Down, Northern Ireland.

== History ==
Down County Council was formed under orders issued in accordance with the Local Government (Ireland) Act 1898 which came into effect on 1 April 1899 for the administrative county of County Down. Its area on establishment consisted of the judicial county of Down, except the portion of the city of Belfast and of the town of Lisburn; and so much of the judicial county of Armagh as comprised the portion of the town of Newry. It was based at Downpatrick Courthouse throughout its existence.

The Local Government (Ireland) Act 1919 introduced proportional representation by means of the single transferable vote (PR-STV) for the 1920 Down County Council election. The area became part of Northern Ireland from 1921 under the Government of Ireland Act 1920. PR-STV was abolished in Northern Ireland under the Local Government Act 1922, with a reversion to first-past-the-post for the 1924 Northern Ireland local elections, the first local elections held in the new jurisdiction.

It was abolished in accordance with the Local Government Act (Northern Ireland) 1972 on 1 October 1973.
