= 1920 Down County Council election =

Local election in Ireland

The 1920 Down County Council election was held on Tuesday 25 May 1920.

== Results by electoral division ==
=== Downpatrick ===
Downpatrick - 4 seats Counted Wednesday 26 May 1920
Party	Candidate	FPv%	Count
Party	Candidate	FPv%	1
UUP	Robert Brown		
Sinn Féin	Henry McGrath		
UUP	Col. Sharman Crawford		
Nationalist	James O'Flinn		
Nationalist	George Walker		
Electorate: -

=== Dromore ===
Dromore - 5 seats Counted Thursday 27 May 1920
Party	Candidate	FPv%	Count
Party	Candidate	FPv%	1
UUP	James Blane		
UUP	Sir R. M. Liddell		
UUP	Norman Dickson Ferguson		
UUP	Ogilvie Blair Graham		
Labour	R. Getgood		
Sinn Féin	J.T. McKee		
UUP	George Wallace		
Nationalist	J. L. Savage		
Electorate: -

=== Newtownards ===
Newtownards - 6 seats Counted Friday 28 May 1920
Party	Candidate	FPv%	Count
Party	Candidate	FPv%	1
UUP	John Miller Andrews D.L.	24.50	2,819
UUP	Alex Dickson	12.33	1,419
UUP	J. M. Thompson	10.75	1,237
UUP	Maj. R. E. McLean	9.47	1,090
UUP	Maj. Gen. W. F. Montgomery D.L.	9.23	1,062
UUP	J. Hill Dickson	8.83	1,016
Labour	A. Adams	8.78	1,010
	E. J. McCall	8.11	933
	W. Gowan	3.23	372
	W. R. Morrow	2.74	315
	J. V. Gosney	1.34	154
	J. Stewart	0.70	80
Electorate: 23,000 Valid: 11,507 Quota: 1,644

=== Newry ===
Newry - 5 seats Counted Saturday 29 May 1920
Party	Candidate	FPv%	Count
Party	Candidate	FPv%	1
UUP	Thomas Carson		
Sinn Féin	John Quinn		
UUP	Robert Kerr		
Sinn Féin	John Rooney		
Sinn Féin	Daniel Higgins		
Nationalist	Patrick O'Neill		
Sinn Féin	Martin G. Shanahan		
Electorate: - Spoilt: Less than 5%

== Notes ==
1. Newtownards electoral area results were declared Friday 28 May 1920. Only J.M. Andrews was elected on the first count.
2. A member of the Dickson family had held the seat on the county council since its formation in 1899.
