= Royal Courts of Justice, Belfast =

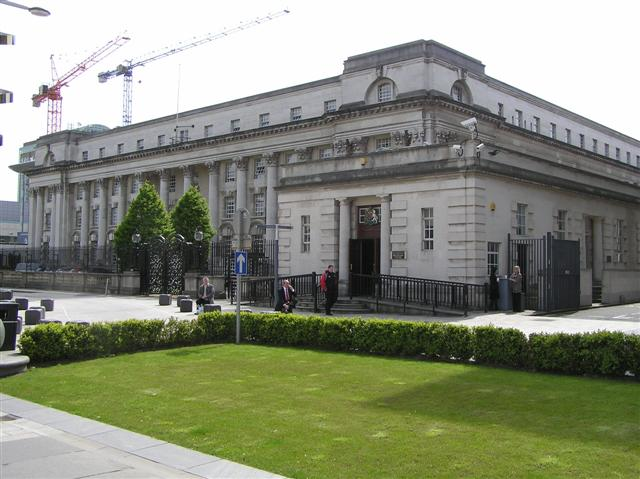
- Royal Courts of Justice, Belfast

- Shown in Northern Ireland
- 54.59730°N 5.92218°W
- Location: Chichester Street, Belfast

History
- Built: 1933

Site notes
- Architect(s): Sir Richard Allison and James Grey West
- Architectural style: Neoclassical style
- Website: justice-ni.gov.uk/contacts/royal-courts-justice

Listed Building – Grade A
- Official name: Royal Courts of Justice, Chichester Street, Belfast
- Designated: 30 November 1988
- Reference no.: HB 26/50/180

The Royal Courts of Justice in Chichester Street, Belfast is the home of the Court of Judicature of Northern Ireland established under the Judicature (Northern Ireland) Act 1978. This comprises the Northern Ireland Court of Appeal, High Court of Northern Ireland and the Crown Court in Northern Ireland. It is a Grade A listed building.

== History ==
Until 1920, the most senior courts in Ireland were in Dublin but under the Government of Ireland Act 1920, the British Government was required to establish a separate judicial system for Northern Ireland.

The building, which was designed by Sir Richard Allison and James Grey West in the Neoclassical style, was built between 1928 and 1933. The building was officially opened by the Governor of Northern Ireland, the Duke of Abercorn, in 1933. The design involved a symmetrical main frontage with thirteen bays facing onto Chichester Street with the end bays slightly projected forward; the central section of three bays featured a deeply recessed portico flanked by four Corinthian order columns supporting an entablature; the centre window on the first floor was decorated with a carving depicting the Royal coat of arms.

The building was targeted during the Troubles and was surrounded with large security screens. It suffered from bomb damage in 1989 and again in January 1997 when the Irish Republican Army attacked the building, resulting in one Royal Ulster Constabulary officer being injured.

The Laganside Courts Complex, located to the north of the main building on the site of a former livestock market, was procured under a private finance initiative contract in 1999. The building, designed by Hurd Rolland and built by a joint venture of Turkington Construction and Karl Group at a cost of £50 million, was completed in 2002. The complex, which created six new courtrooms for the Crown Court, six new magistrates courts and four new county courts, replaced the Newtownabbey Courthouse, the Belfast magistrates' court and the Crumlin Road Courthouse.

== See also ==
- Northern Ireland Courts and Tribunals Service
- Royal Courts of Justice, London
- Parliament House, Edinburgh
