= Denise McBride =

Northern Irish judge and former barrister

The Right Honourable Lady Justice McBride DBE
- Monarchs: Elizabeth II; Charles III

Lady Justice of Appeal of Northern Ireland
- Incumbent
- Assumed office 4 September 2026

Judge of the High Court of Justice in Northern Ireland
- In office 23 October 2015 – 4 September 2026

Personal details
- Citizenship: United Kingdom
- Education: Down High School; Queen's University Belfast
- Awards: QC (2011); DBE (2015)

Dame Denise Anne McBride, DBE, styled The Rt Hon Lady Justice McBride, is a Northern Irish judge and former barrister specialising in chancery, family, civil and international law. In October 2015, she was appointed the first female judge of the High Court of Northern Ireland, and she was appointed to the Court of Appeal of Northern Ireland in September 2026.

== Early life ==
McBride was educated at Clough Primary School and Down High School, a grammar school in Downpatrick, County Down, Northern Ireland. She studied law at Queen's University Belfast, and graduated with a Bachelor of Laws (LLB) degree in June 1988.

== Legal career ==
McBride was called to the Bar of Northern Ireland in 1989. In September 2011, she was appointed a Queen's Counsel (QC). From 2012 to 2014, she was Vice Chair of the Bar Council of Northern Ireland.

In addition to her practising career, she is also involved in the academic side of law. Since 1991, she has been a tutor and guest lecturer in land law at the School of Law, Queen's University Belfast. In 2006, she was appointed an Honorary Lecturer "in recognition of long service as a tutor and guest lecturer".

On 23 October 2015, McBride was appointed a judge of the High Court of Justice in Northern Ireland. Two weeks later, McBride was appointed deputy chair of the Boundary Commission for Northern Ireland.

On 23 November 2015, she was appointed a Dame Commander of the Order of the British Empire (DBE).
