= List of High Court judges of Northern Ireland =

This is a list of High Court judges of Northern Ireland, arranged by order of appointment, as of 12 June 2026:

1. Sir John Ailbe O'Hara
2. Dame Denise McBride
3. Sir Gerry McAlinden
4. Sir Ian Huddleston
5. Sir David Scoffield
6. Sir Michael Humphreys
7. Sir Kevin James Rooney
8. Sir Stephen Alexander Fowler
9. Sir Patrick Kinney
10. Sir Paul Christopher McLaughlin
11. Dame Patricia Smyth

== See also ==
- Lord Chief Justice of Northern Ireland
- List of Lords Justices of Appeal of Northern Ireland
