= Sonia Proudman =

British judge (1949–2023)

Dame Sonia Rosemary Susan Proudman, DBE (30 July 1949 – 22 July 2023), styled The Hon. Mrs Justice Proudman, was a judge of the High Court of England and Wales.

== Education ==
Proudman was educated at St Paul's Girls' School and Lady Margaret Hall, Oxford. She was one of the first female winners of the Eldon Scholarship.

== Career ==
Proudman was called to the Bar, Lincoln's Inn in 1972. She became a Bencher in 1996 and a Recorder in 2000. She was a Deputy High Court Judge from 2001 to 2008, until she was appointed to the Chancery Division on a full-time basis. She was the second woman assigned to the Chancery Division, after Mary Arden.

Proudman was made a Dame Commander of the Order of the British Empire in 2008.

Proudman retired from the bench on 2 October 2017.

== Death ==
Sonia Proudman died on 22 July 2023, at the age of 73.

== Arms ==
Proudman obtained a grant of arms in 2009.

Coat of arms of Sonia Proudman
Escutcheon Gules a Cross voided throughout Or surmounted by a Peacock in his pride proper perched upon a Cartwheel Argent. Motto Auctoritate Paulisper Ornatus
