= David Foxton =

British judge (born 1965)

The Right Honourable Lord Justice Foxton
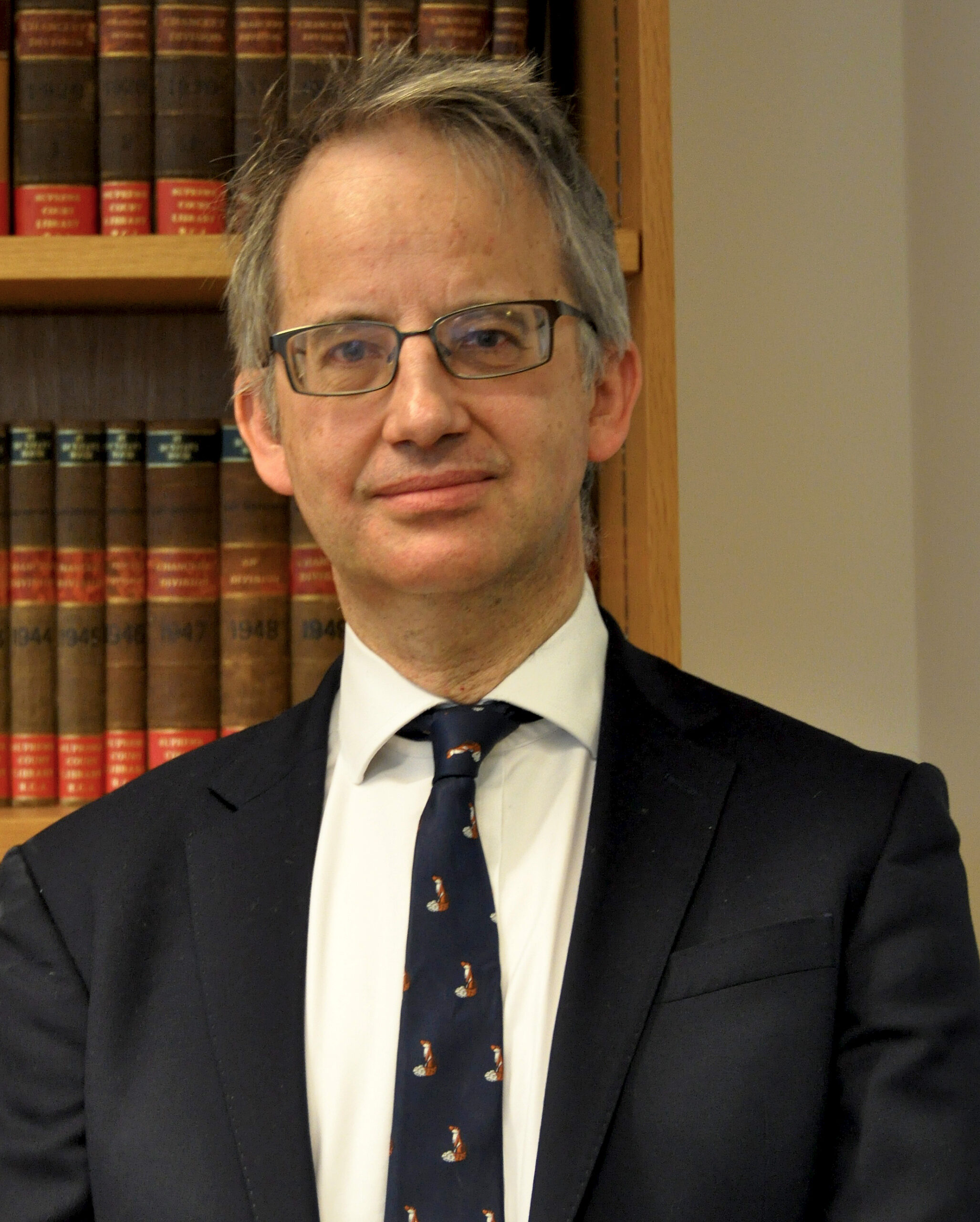
- Foxton in 2022

Lord Justice of Appeal
- Incumbent
- Assumed office 12 January 2026
- Monarch: Charles III

Justice of the High Court
- In office 13 January 2020 – 11 January 2026
- Monarchs: Elizabeth II; Charles III

Personal details
- Born: 14 October 1965 (age 60) United Kingdom
- Education: Magdalen College, Oxford; King's College London

Sir David Andrew Foxton styled The Rt. Hon. Lord Justice Foxton, (born 14 October 1965) is a British Lord Justice of Appeal.

== Education ==
Foxton was educated at Glasgow Academy. He took a first-class BA in jurisprudence and BCL from Magdalen College, Oxford, in 1986 and 1987 respectively. He was an Eldon Scholar in 1989 and completed a PhD at King's College London in 2001.

== Career ==
He was called to the bar at Gray's Inn in 1989. He established a practice in commercial law, based at Essex Court Chambers from 1989 to 2020. He took silk in 2006. In addition to practice, he wrote several books. He was editor, with Sir Bernard Eder, of Scrutton on Charterparties and Bills of Lading from 2008 to 2015. He wrote Revolutionary Lawyers: Sinn Fein and Crown Courts in Britain and Ireland 1916–1923 in 2008 and The Life of T. E. Scrutton, concerning the former Lord Justice of Appeal Thomas Edward Scrutton, in 2013.

He has been a visiting professor of law at the University of Nottingham since 2007. He was appointed Freeman of the City of London in 2007.

He was head of chambers at Essex Court Chambers from 2017 to 2020.

=== Judicial career ===
He served as a recorder from 2009 to 2020 and a deputy High Court judge from 2016 to 2020.

On 13 January 2020, he was appointed a judge of the High Court and received the customary knighthood in the same year. He was assigned to the Queen's Bench Division and appointed to the Commercial Court. He is on the Financial List, hears cases on the Competition Appeal Tribunal and sits on the Administrative Court. He was formerly Judge in Charge of the Commercial Court.

On 15 January 2026, he was appointed Lord Justice of Appeal.

== Personal life ==
In 1992, he married Heather Crook, with whom he has two sons and two daughters.
