= Downpatrick Courthouse =

County building in Downpatrick, Northern Ireland

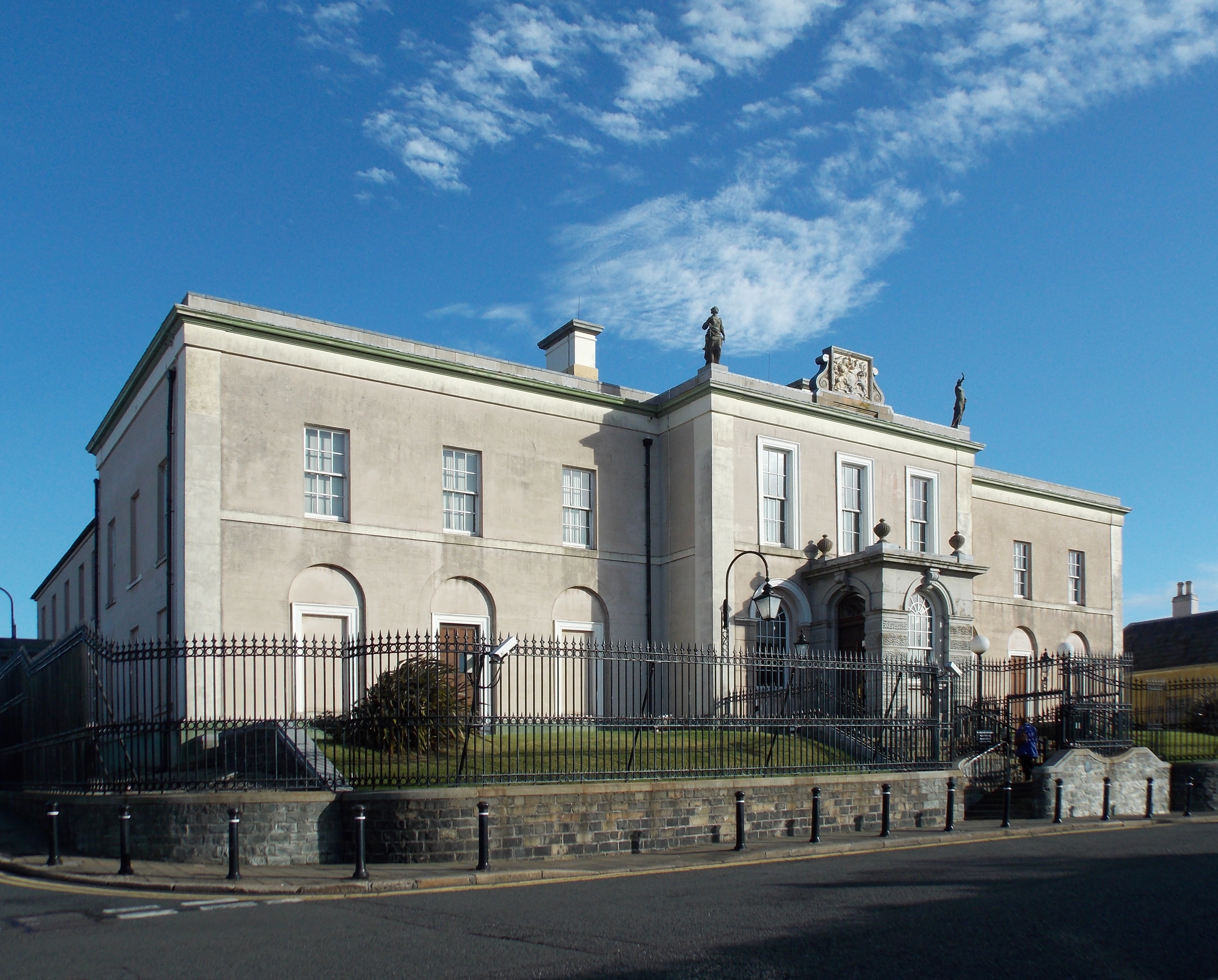
- Downpatrick Courthouse

- Shown in Northern Ireland
- 54.3290°N 5.7190°W
- Location: Downpatrick, County Down

History
- Built: 1735

Site notes
- Architectural style: Neoclassical style
- Website: nidirect.gov.uk/contacts/downpatrick-court

Listed Building – Grade B+
- Official name: Courthouse, English Street, Downpatrick
- Designated: 9 November 1976
- Reference no.: HB 18/20/002

Downpatrick Courthouse is a judicial facility on English Street, Downpatrick, County Down, Northern Ireland. The courthouse, which served as the headquarters of Down County Council from 1899 to 1973, is a Grade B+ listed building.

== History ==
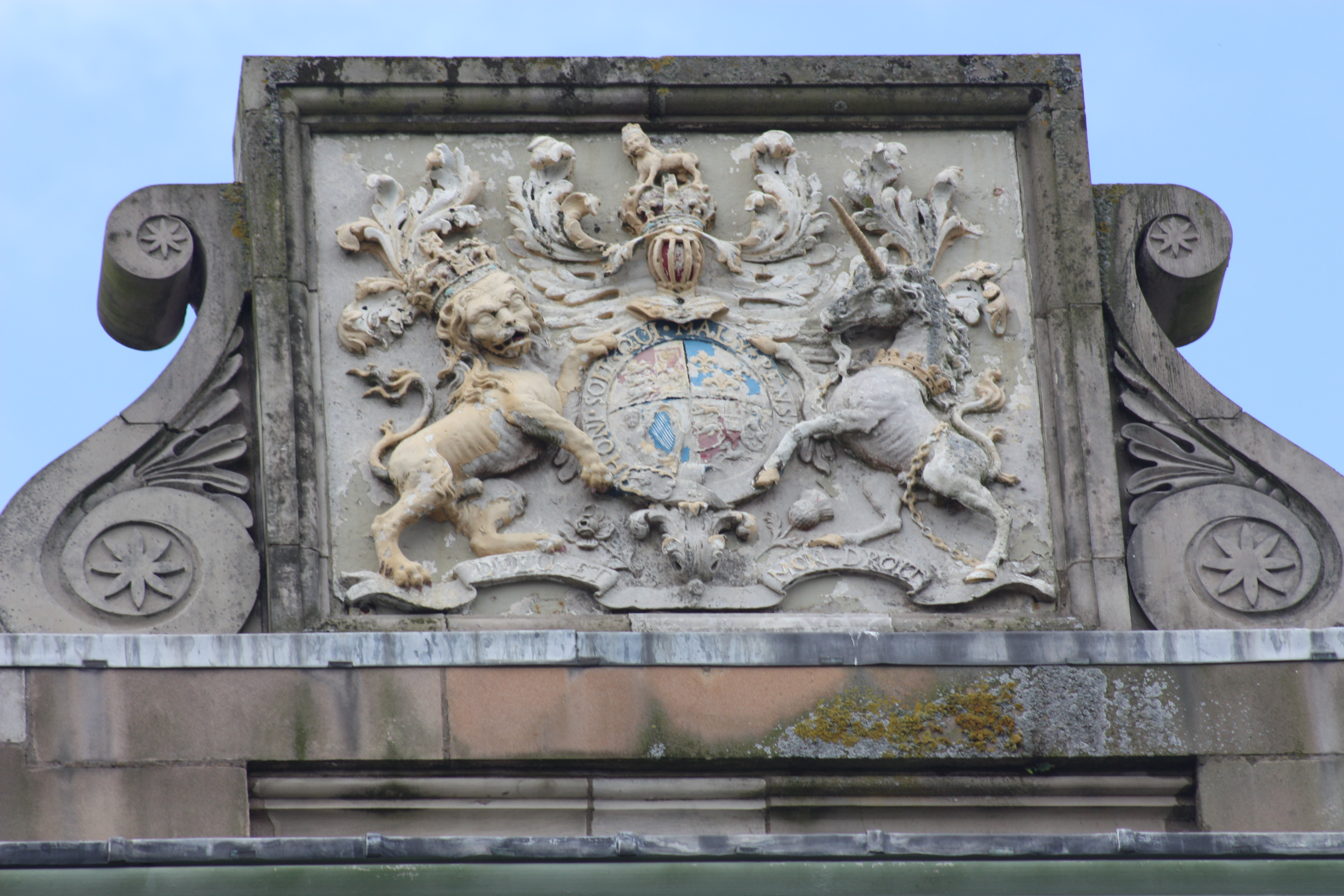
The Royal coat of arms on the parapet

The site currently occupied by the courthouse is thought to have been previously occupied by St John the Evangelist's Priory, sometimes referred to as "the Monastery of the Irish", which was established by Saint Malachy in the 12th century.

The current building, which was designed by Hugh Darling of Dublin in the Neoclassical style, was completed in 1735. It was substantially rebuilt to the designs of the county surveyor, Henry Smyth, after a major fire in 1855. The design involved a symmetrical main frontage of nine bays facing onto English Street; the central section of three bays, which slightly projected forwards, featured a single-storey porch with a round headed window at the front, doorways on each side and urns on the top; there were sash windows on the first floor and there was a carving depicting the Royal coat of arms flanked by two figures, carved in lead, depicting Justice and Ceres, on the parapet. A tunnel was built from courthouse to the basement of the town gaol (now part of Down High School), about 130 yards (120 m) to the north, in 1857.

The building was originally used as a facility for dispensing justice but, following the implementation of the Local Government (Ireland) Act 1898, which established county councils in every county, it also became the meeting place for Down County Council. The county council continued to use the courthouse as its headquarters until the county council was abolished in 1973. In an incident in May 2003, two men being held at the courthouse overpowered a policeman and escaped from the building: both men were subsequently re-arrested.

In May 2012 the justice minister, David Ford, said that he accepted an inspection report recommending that the Downpatrick Courthouse should close in a proposed rationalisation of the court system. In October 2017, it was the venue for the premier of a play, "Lives in Translation", written by the Irish playwright, Rosemary Jenkinson, about a woman, Asha, who was seeking political asylum after fleeing from conflict in Africa.
