= Sara Cockerill =

British judge (born 1968)

The Right Honourable Lady Justice Cockerill DBE KC
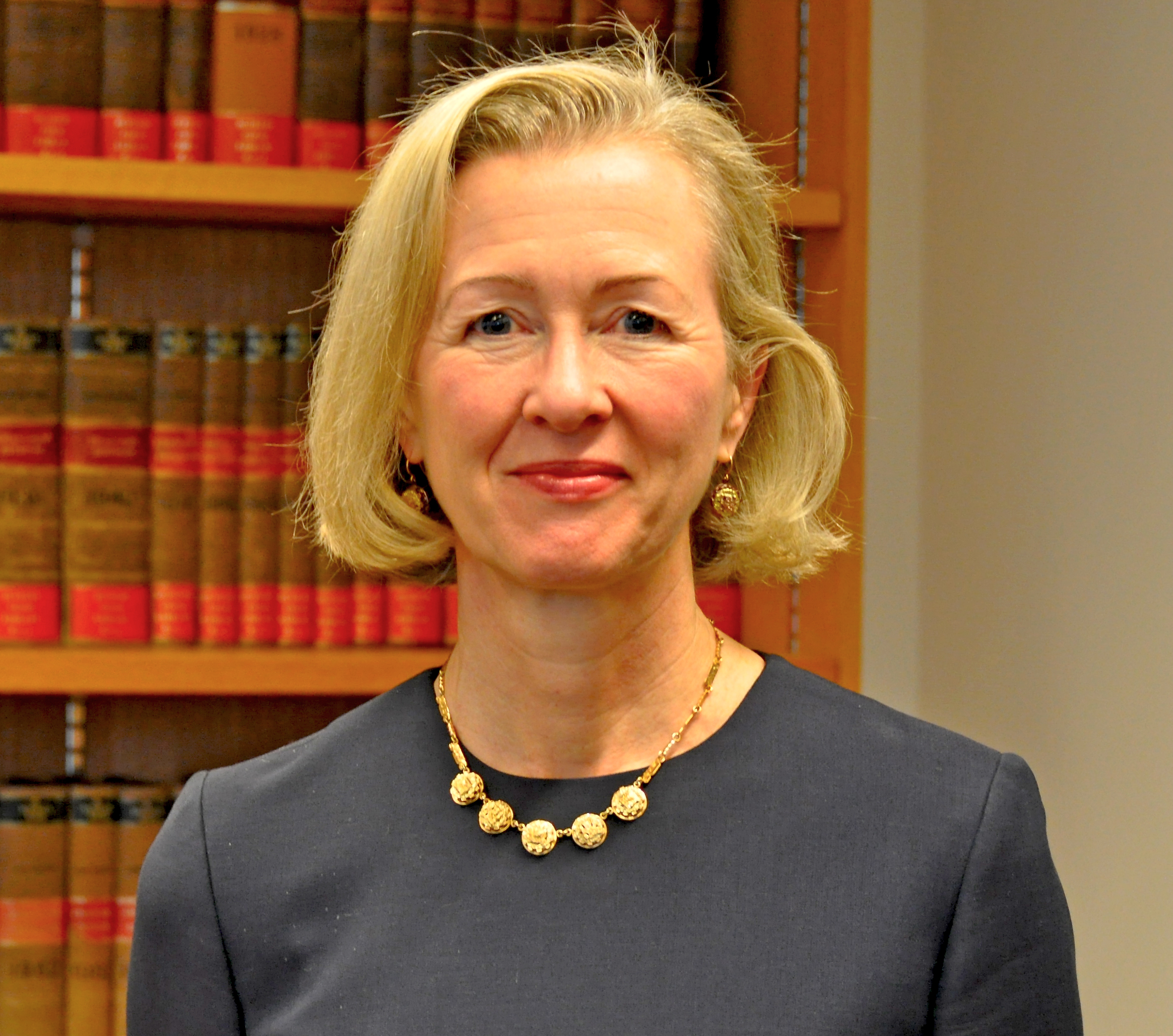

Lady Justice of Appeal
- Incumbent
- Assumed office 9 October 2025
- Monarch: Charles III

High Court Judge King's Bench Division
- In office 1 November 2017 – 8 October 2025
- Monarchs: Elizabeth II; Charles III

Personal details
- Born: 7 November 1968 (age 57) Weston-super-Mare, England
- Education: St Anne's College, Oxford

Dame Sara Elizabeth Cockerill (born 7 November 1968) is a British Lady Justice of Appeal and Deputy Head of Civil Justice.

== Early life and education ==
Cockerill was born in Weston-super-Mare, England and was educated at Lady Eleanor Holles School, funded by the Assisted Places Scheme. She studied at St Anne's College, Oxford and completed a first-class BA in jurisprudence in 1989. She was an Eldon Scholar in 1990.

== Career ==
In 1990, Cockerill was called to the bar at Lincoln's Inn, and practised at the bar from Essex Court Chambers and Four Essex Court, specialising in commercial law and compelled evidence. She took silk in 2011 and served as a deputy High Court judge from 2016 to 2017. Having been from 2011 a contributor to the White Book, she has been a member of its senior editorial board since 2020. She wrote Compelled Evidence in Civil Proceedings in 2011.

In addition to legal publications, Cockerill has written books on medieval history, including Eleanor of Castile: the Shadow Queen in 2014 and Eleanor of Aquitaine: Queen of France and England, Mother of Empires in 2019.

=== High Court appointment ===
On 1 November 2017, Cockerill was appointed a judge of the High Court and assigned to the Queen's Bench Division. She received the customary damehood in 2017. She was authorised to hear cases on the Financial List, at the Competition Appeal Tribunal and the Administrative Court, and did general Queen's Bench work. She was appointed Judge in Charge of the Commercial Court in August 2020 until 31 July 2022. During the Venezuelan presidential crisis, Cockerill ruled that Venezuela's gold reserves deposited in the Bank of England should remain frozen.

=== Court of Appeal appointment ===
On 9 October 2025, Cockerill was appointed a Lady Justice of Appeal. She was appointed the Deputy Head of Civil Justice 1 November 2025.

== Personal life ==
In 1997, Cockerill married Nigel Eaton.
