= Timothy Fancourt =

British judge (born 1964)

The Right Honourable Lord Justice Fancourt
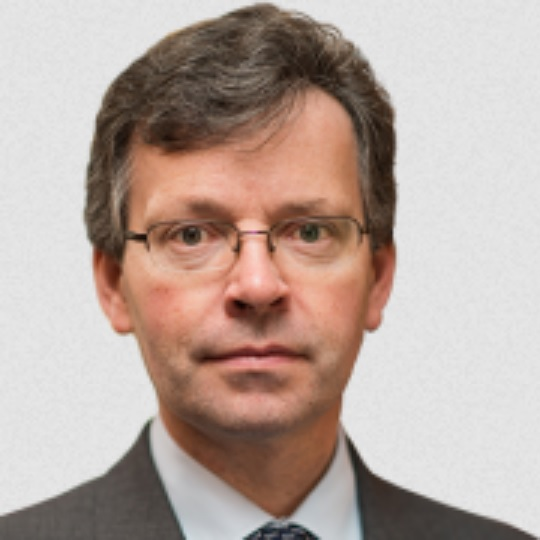
- Fancourt in 2019

Justice of the High Court
- Incumbent
- Assumed office 11 January 2018

Justice of the High Court
- In office 2017 – 1 October 2026

Personal details
- Born: 30 August 1964 (age 62)
- Education: Gonville and Caius College, Cambridge
- Profession: Judge

Sir Timothy Miles Fancourt (born 30 August 1964), judicially styled as Lord Justice Fancourt, is a judge of the English Court of Appeal.

== Personal life and education ==
Fancourt was born on 30 August 1964 and attended Whitgift School in Croydon. He studied law at Gonville and Caius College, Cambridge. He has returned to Caius to preside over College moot trial competitions.

== Career ==
He was called to the Bar at Lincoln's Inn in 1987. He was appointed Queen's Counsel in 2003.

In 1996 he was elected to the Bar Council of England and Wales. He was appointed as a Recorder in 2009 sitting at Harrow Crown Court until 2017. In 2012 he was appointed chairman of the Chancery Bar Association.

He was appointed a deputy High Court judge in 2013 and as a High Court Judge assigned to the Chancery Division on 11 January 2018. He received the customary knighthood in May 2019. In 2021, he was appointed Vice-Chancellor of the County Palatine of Lancaster.

On 12 June 2026, his appointment to the Court of Appeal was announced, and he took up the appointment on 1 October 2026, subsequently receiving the customary appointment to the Privy Council on 11 November 2026.

Fancourt is a co-editor of Muir Watt & Moss: Agricultural Holdings.
