= Christopher Butcher =

Lord Justice of Appeal

The Right Honourable Lord Justice Butcher
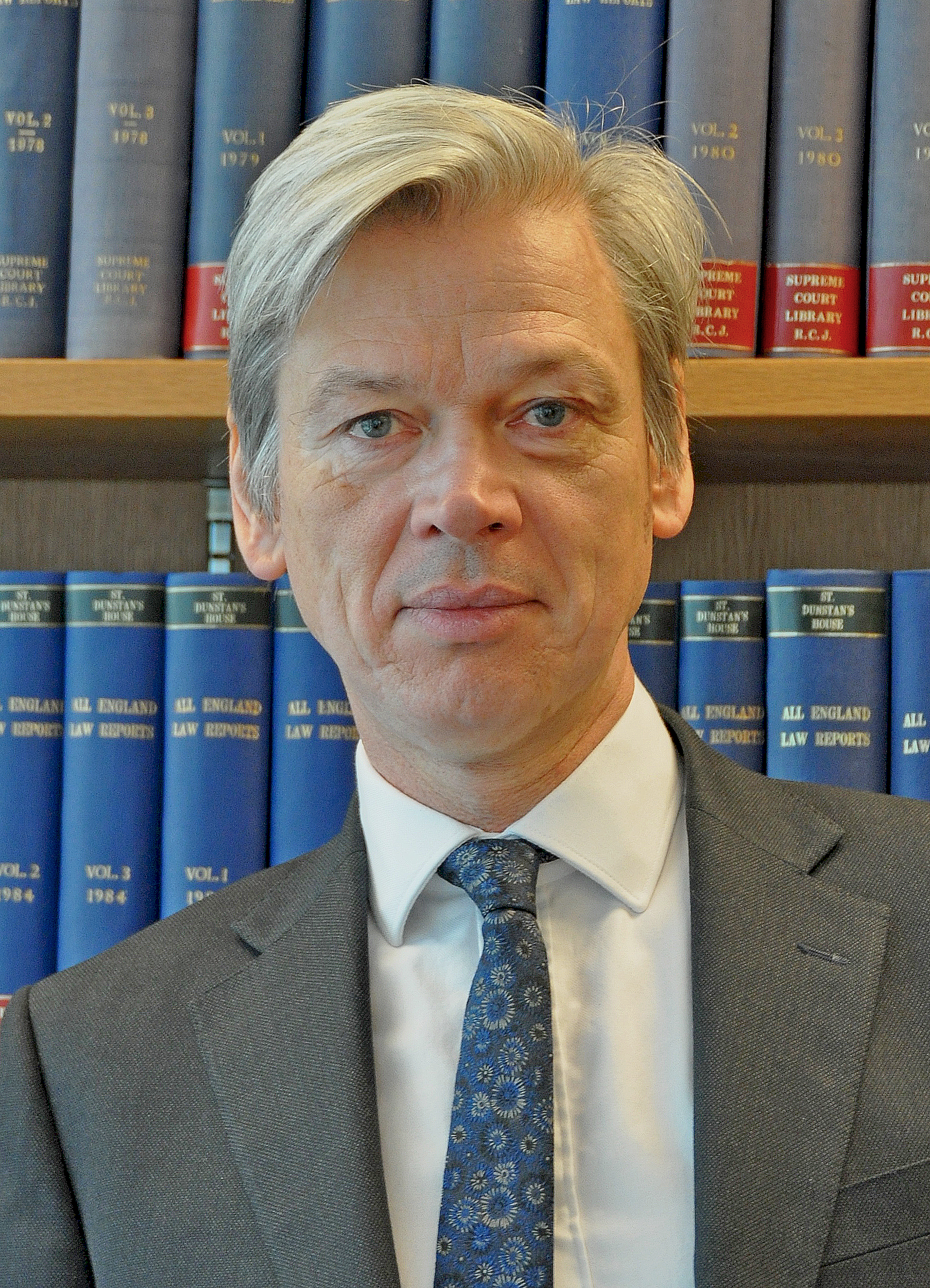
- Butcher in 2022

Lord Justice of Appeal
- Incumbent
- Assumed office 1 October 2026
- Monarchs: Elizabeth II; Charles III

Personal details
- Born: 14 August 1962 (age 64) Haslemere
- Children: 2
- Education: Magdalen College, Oxford

Sir Christopher John Butcher styled The Rt Hon Lord Justice Butcher, is a judge of the Court of Appeal of England and Wales.

== Personal life and education ==
Butcher was born on 14 August 1962 in Haslemere, Surrey. He was educated at Charterhouse and Magdalen College, Oxford, where he read Modern History. He was elected a Prize Fellow of All Souls College, Oxford in 1983.

Butcher married Fiona Gaskin in 1992, with whom he has two children.

Butcher is Chairperson of the Oxford-based charity, The Radcliffe Trust.

== Career ==
He was called to the Bar by Gray's Inn in 1986 and joined the London based chambers '7 King's Bench Walk', specialising in shipping, banking, arbitration and Insurance. Butcher was appointed King's Counsel in 2001.

He would go on to become a Bencher of Gray's Inn in 2005, a Recorder in 2009, and a Deputy High Court Judge in 2013. He was a Judge of the High Court of Justice (King's Bench Division) from 2018 to 2026, and received the customary knighthood in 2019 from the late Queen Elizabeth II. He was appointed to the Court of Appeal on 1 October 2026, and was sworn of the Privy Council on 11 November 2026.

== Awards and scholarships ==
He was awarded the Eldon Law Scholarship by the University of Oxford in 1987.

He achieved Chambers and Partners' Insurance Silk of the Year in 2008 and 2014.

Butcher was awarded a PhD by King's College London in 2019 for his thesis on Sir Thomas Noon Talfourd.
