= Richard Meade (judge) =

British judge

The Right Honourable Mr Justice Meade
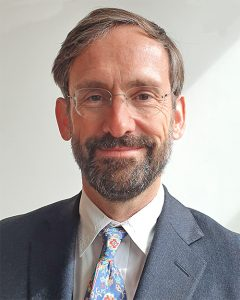
- Meade in 2020

Justice of the High Court
- Incumbent
- Assumed office 7 September 2020

Personal details
- Born: 14 November 1966 (age 59) London, England
- Education: University College, Oxford

Sir Richard David Meade (born 14 November 1966) is a British High Court judge.

== Personal life and education ==
Meade is the son of Prof Thomas Wilson Meade and was born in London, England. He was educated at William Ellis School in London, then completed a BA in jurisprudence at University College, Oxford in 1988. In 1991, he received the Scarman Scholarship to support his bar vocational course.

In 2003, he married Sara Louise Payne and together they have a son and two daughters.

== Career ==
Meade was called to the bar at Lincoln's Inn in 1991 and practised intellectual property law from 8 New Square chambers. He appeared before the European Court of Justice and European Patent Office as a barrister. He took silk in 2008, served as a recorder from 2010, and was appointed deputy High Court judge in 2011. In addition to practice, he jointly edited Kerly's Law of Trade Marks and Trade Names from the thirteenth edition in 2001 to the fourteenth edition in 2005.

On 7 September 2020, he was appointed a judge of the High Court, replacing Dame Vivien Rose who was promoted to the Court of Appeal, and he was assigned to the Chancery Division. He received the customary knighthood in the same year. He is the Judge in Charge of the Patents Court and Intellectual Property.
