= Padley (surname) =

Padley is a surname. Notable people with the surname include:

- Barry Padley (born 1949), Australian rules footballer
- Bill Padley (born 1961), British record producer and songwriter
- George Padley (1882–1965), British footballer
- James Sandby Padley (1792–1881), British surveyor, architect and civil engineer
- Marcus Padley, British stockbroker and writer
- Walter Padley (1916–1984), British politician
- William Padley (1842–1904), British cricketer
