= County Hall, Cambridge =

County building in Cambridge, Cambridgeshire, England

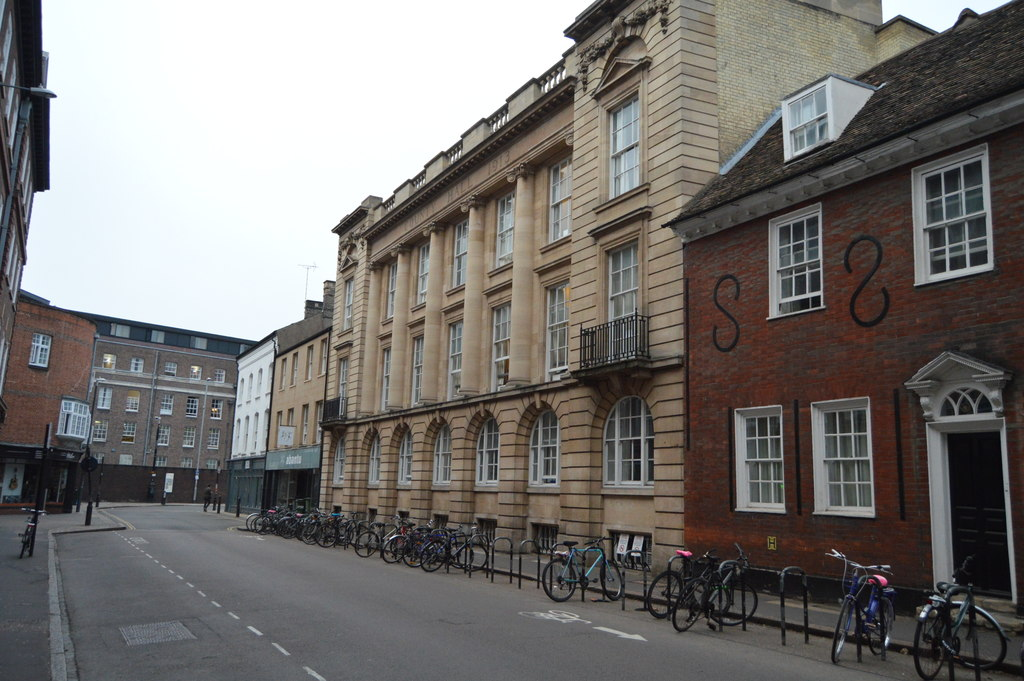

- Location within Cambridgeshire
- 52.2069°N 0.1216°E
- Location: Cambridge, Cambridgeshire

History
- Built: 1913; 113 years ago

Site notes
- Architect: Herbert Henry Dunn
- Architectural style: Neoclassical style

Listed Building – Grade II
- Designated: 2 November 1972
- Reference no.: 1265198

County Hall is a former municipal building, now used for student accommodation, in Hobson Street, Cambridge, Cambridgeshire, England. It is a Grade II listed building.

== History ==
Originally the old shire house on Market Hill had been used as the local facility for dispensing justice. However, following the implementation of the Local Government Act 1888, which established county councils in every county, county leaders decided that enhanced facilities were required to accommodate a meeting place for Cambridgeshire County Council. The site selected had previously been occupied by a Wesleyan Methodist chapel which had vacated the site in October 1913 when the congregation moved to Wesley Methodist Church, Cambridge.

The new building, designed by Herbert Henry Dunn in the neoclassical style, was formally opened by Sir George Fordham, the chairman of the county council, on 5 February 1914. The design involved a symmetrical main frontage with seven bays facing Hobson Street with the end bays slightly projected forwards; there were round-headed windows on the ground floor and sash windows on the first and second floors interspersed with tall Ionic order columns which supported an entablature carved with the words "County Hall 1913". A memorial commemorating council staff who died in the First World War was erected in the building after the war.

By the late 1920s the county council had also found the Hobson Street building too small and chose to move to the shire hall at Castle Hill in 1933. The building in Hobson Street continued to be used by the county council for, amongst other things, the County Planning Office and the County Record Office, until it was acquired by Christ's College, Cambridge in 1986. It was subsequently converted to student accommodation, based on designs by Lyster, Grillet and Harding, and renamed the Todd Building, after Lord Todd, a Nobel laureate. The conversion works included the installation of a smoked-glass drum containing a spiral staircase to provide additional access for students and alterations to the rooms on the second floor to create a lecture theatre which was named the Plumb Auditorium, after Sir John Plumb, a historian. Todd and Plumb had both become fellows of Christ's College, in Todd’s case in 1944 and in Plumb's case in 1946.
