= Wesley Methodist Church, Cambridge =

Wesley Methodist Church
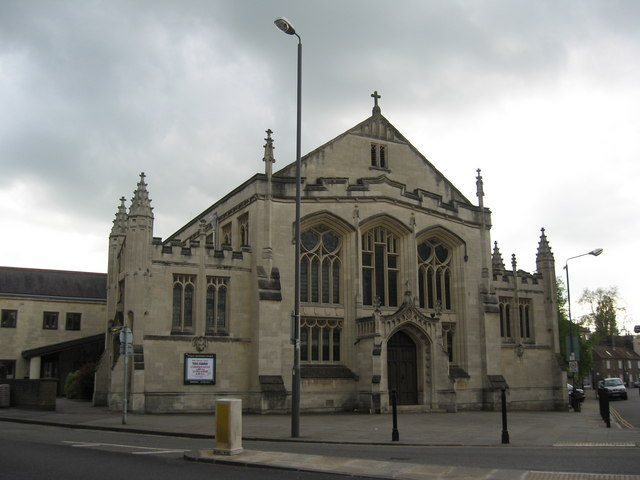
- Wesley Methodist Church
- 52°12′26.56″N 0°7′36.82″E
- Location: Christ's Pieces, Cambridge; CB1 1LG
- Country: England
- Denomination: Methodist Church of Great Britain
- Website: www.wesleycam.org.uk

History
- Founded: 1913

Architecture
- Functional status: Active
- Style: Neo-Gothic

Administration
- District: East Anglia District

Wesley Methodist Church is a Methodist church located next to Christ's Pieces in central Cambridge, England. The church was founded in 1913 "to attract and retain, and not repel, the young Methodists who come to this University", in the words of the then President of the Wesleyan Methodist Conference.

The church was built to replace an earlier Wesleyan Methodist church on Hobson Street, built in 1849, whose site was developed for the County Hall of Cambridgeshire. It is named for John Wesley, a founder of Methodism. The structure is characteristic of the Gothic Revival style of architecture. It was extensively refurbished in 1990 at a cost of £1.3 million. An 1844 William Hill organ was installed in the 1990 refurbishment.

Wesley is one of thirteen churches in the Cambridge Methodist Circuit, and one of two Methodist churches in the city of Cambridge, with the other in Castle Street. The building is now a focus for various social activities; it is a working church with daily prayer and several Sunday services each week. Cambridge Student Methodist Society (MethSoc), a student group, holds its weekly meetings in the church's "Upper Room".

The church has close links to other Methodist institutions in Cambridge, including Wesley House theological college, and The Leys School.
