= Barton station =

Barton station may refer to:

== Railway stations ==
- Barton railway station, West Lancashire, England (1887–1938)
- Barton and Broughton railway station, Lancashire, England (1840–1939)
- Barton and Walton railway station, Staffordshire, England (1839–1958)
- Barton's Bridge station, a former name of Flemington Junction station, New Jersey, US (1875–1961)
- Barton Hill railway station, North Yorkshire, England (1845–1930)
- Barton le Street railway station, North Yorkshire, England (1853–1931)
- Barton Moss railway station, Lancashire (now Greater Manchester), England (1832–1929)
- Barton-on-Humber railway station, Lincolnshire, England (1849 – present)
- Barton Stacey railway station, Hampshire, England (1939–1940)
- Barton Street railway station, a former name of St Luke's railway station, Southport, Lancashire (now Merseyside), England (1883–1968)

== Other ==
- Barton-upon-Humber Police Station, Lincolnshire, England (1847–2005)
- Barton Power Station, Lancashire (now Greater Manchester), England (1923–1974)
- Barton Station, unincorporated community also known as Barton, Alabama, US
