= Thropp and Harding =

English surveyors and architects

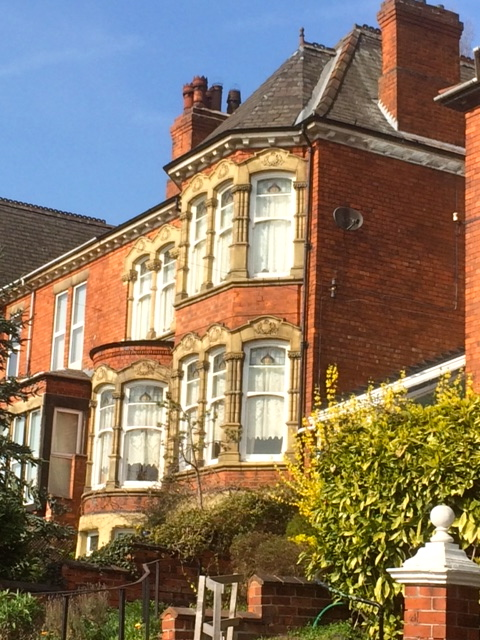
- 49 Yarborough Road Lincoln, 1896

Practice information
- Key architects: Thropp and Harding
- Partners: James Thropp and George Robinson Harding
- Founded: June 1853
- Dissolved: October 1921
- Location: 29 Broadgate, Lincoln

Significant works and honors
- Buildings: Police Headquarters Quarters and Magistrates Court, Scunthorpe

Thropp and Harding were surveyors and an architectural practice in Lincoln working from 1 James Street and 29 Broadgate, Lincoln. James Thropp was initially in partnership with James Sandby Padley until 1881 He then worked on his own until 1901. Between 1891 and 1896, the Lincoln architect Herbert Henry Dunn was his assistant and at the same time, 1891–6, George Robinson Harding, was articled to him. In 1901 Thropp and Harding formed a partnership which was dissolved in Oct 1921. The architectural practice continued under Harding until after the Second World War. Thropp was a member of the Institute of Civil Engineers and was surveyor to the Lindsey County Council. In 1883 Thropp published a 3rd edition of Padley's large scale survey of Lincoln. James Thropp of 27 Bailgate died 8 September 1923

== Work of Thropp and Harding ==
Apart from work for the Lindsey County Council, Thropp also laid out new streets in Lincoln and designed terraced houses and villas.

- Police Headquarters Quarters and Magistrates Court, High Street East, Scunthorpe. 1894 Brick and stone, Jacobean, with exceedingly tall polygonal chimneys. Later Ukrainian Church of the Holy Cross.
- 49 Yarborough Road, Lincoln. 1896. Brick terrace house with extensive use of decorative artificial stonework.
- 7 Greetwell Road, Lincoln. 1901. Notable Queen Anne Style house with tile hanging designed by Thropp and Harding for the Rev. Walter Hicks.
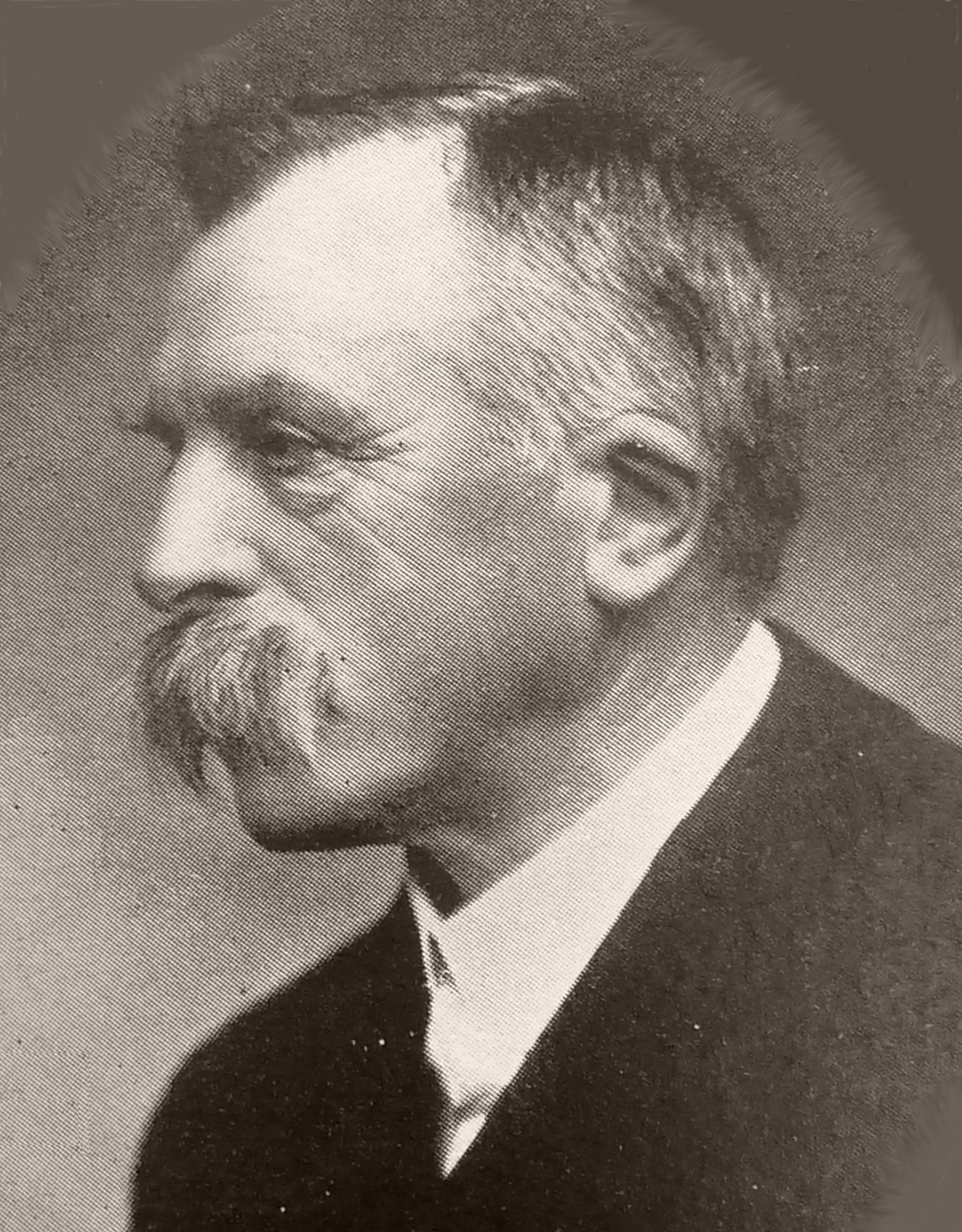
James Thropp, in 1907

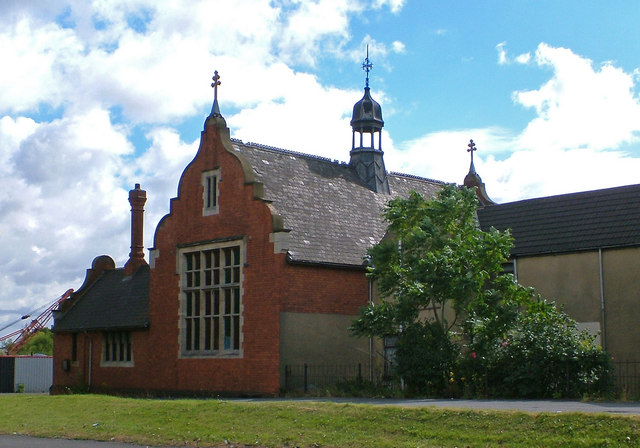
Ukrainian Catholic Church, Scunthorpe

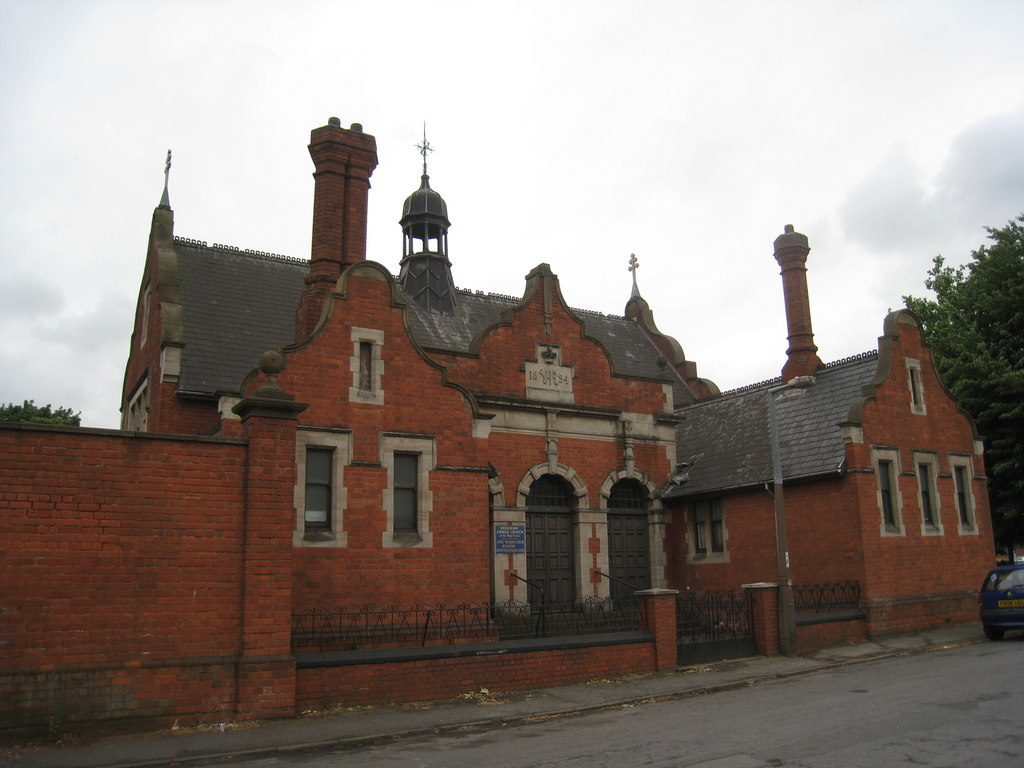
Scunthorpe Ukrainian Catholic Church of the Holy Cross
