= Herbert Henry Dunn =

English architect

- Born: c.1865
- Died: 1935
- Education: Articled to William Skill, surveyor, Bailgate, Lincoln 1882–85
- Occupation: Architect
- Practice: St Peter's Churchyard, Lincoln and then Cambridgeshire County surveyor.
- Buildings: Cambridgeshire County Hall and Shirehall
- Projects: Extensive rebuilding of the Lincoln Teacher's Training College 1901/1904. Now Bishop Grosseteste University

Herbert Henry Dunn (c. 1865–1935) was an English architect who worked in Lincoln in the early 20th century before becoming the surveyor to the Cambridgeshire County Council. He designed buildings in Lincoln and Lincolnshire, before moving to Cambridgeshire shortly before the 1st World War. His most notable buildings in Cambridge are the County Hall which is now part of Christ's College and the Cambridgeshire Shire Hall. Dunn was also the architect for the pioneering Sawston Village College.

== Career ==
Dunn was articled to William Skill, a surveyor at 58, Bailgate, Lincoln from 1882 to 1885. He then worked in the offices of W. Sindall builder in Cambridge from 1885 to 1887, and then as an improver and later assistant to William Cecil Marshall from 1887 to 1891. He returned to Lincoln to work as an assistant to James Thropp from 1891 to 1896. He qualified ARIBA in 1896 and was proposed by William Watkins, William Milner Fawcett, and William Douglas Caröe. He shortly afterwards set up his own office at St Peter's Churchyard in Silver Street, Lincoln. He was probably appointed Cambridgeshire county surveyor in 1910, after the death of William Milner Fawcett, who had previously held that position. He became a Fellow of the Royal Institute of British Architects FRIBA in 1925.

== Work by H.H. Dunn ==
=== In Lincoln and Lincolnshire ===
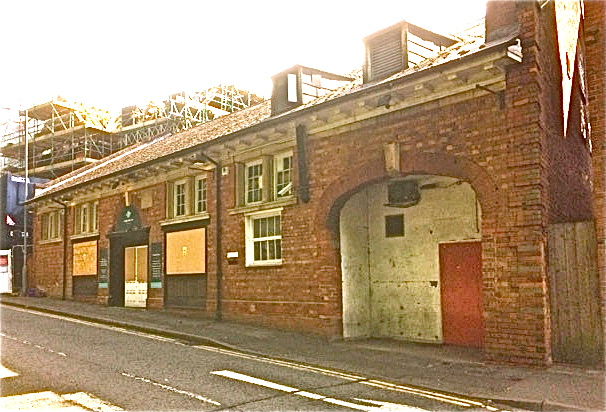
Former Salerooms, Beaumont Fee, Lincoln, 1912

- 9–11 The Avenue, Lincoln. 1896. Built by/for Charles Sands, architect H H Dunn.
- Victorian Turkish baths, Corner of Monks Road and Baggholme Road, 97 Monks Road. Built for Mr R W Doughty
- Lyleston and Northfield, Church Lane, Lincoln.
- 297 High Street/22 Saltergate, Lincoln C. Pratt & Sons former premises on the south side of Clasketgate and 297 High Street (Ann Summers). The block includes the Co-op Bank, the Still and Martin Smith, optician. Brick with stone dressings. The building is showing some of the earliest influence of the Neo-Georgian style in Lincoln with classical pedimented gables and pilasters. The former Lipton premises (adjacent to the High Bridge, by Scorer and Gamble) in the Tudor Gothic style compliments it with the semi-circular oriel corner window.
- Bishop King Building (1900/1) at the Lincoln Diocesan Training College now part of the Joyce Skinner Building at the Bishop Grosseteste University, Lincoln. Further alterations to the Joyce Skinner building in 1904 and the new Girl's Practising school (now called the Old School) in 1904.
- De Aston Grammar School, Market Rasen, (1904–08)
- Clubhouse for the Lincoln Golf Club at Torksey 1904.
- Kesteven and Grantham Girls' School, Grantham 1910. (the school at which Margaret Thatcher was educated).

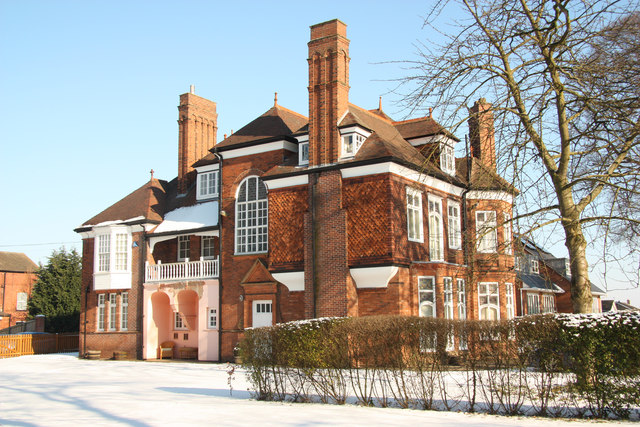
St.Nicholas Parsonage, Newport, Lincoln, 1912

- St Nicholas Vicarage, Newport, Lincoln. 1912. Built for the Rev. Canon Leeke. Arts and Crafts style.
- Former saleroom, Beaumont Fee, Lincoln. Architect Henry Herbert Dunn. Built for J A Cox, 1912. Later Big Wok, Chinese restaurant.

=== In Cambridgeshire ===
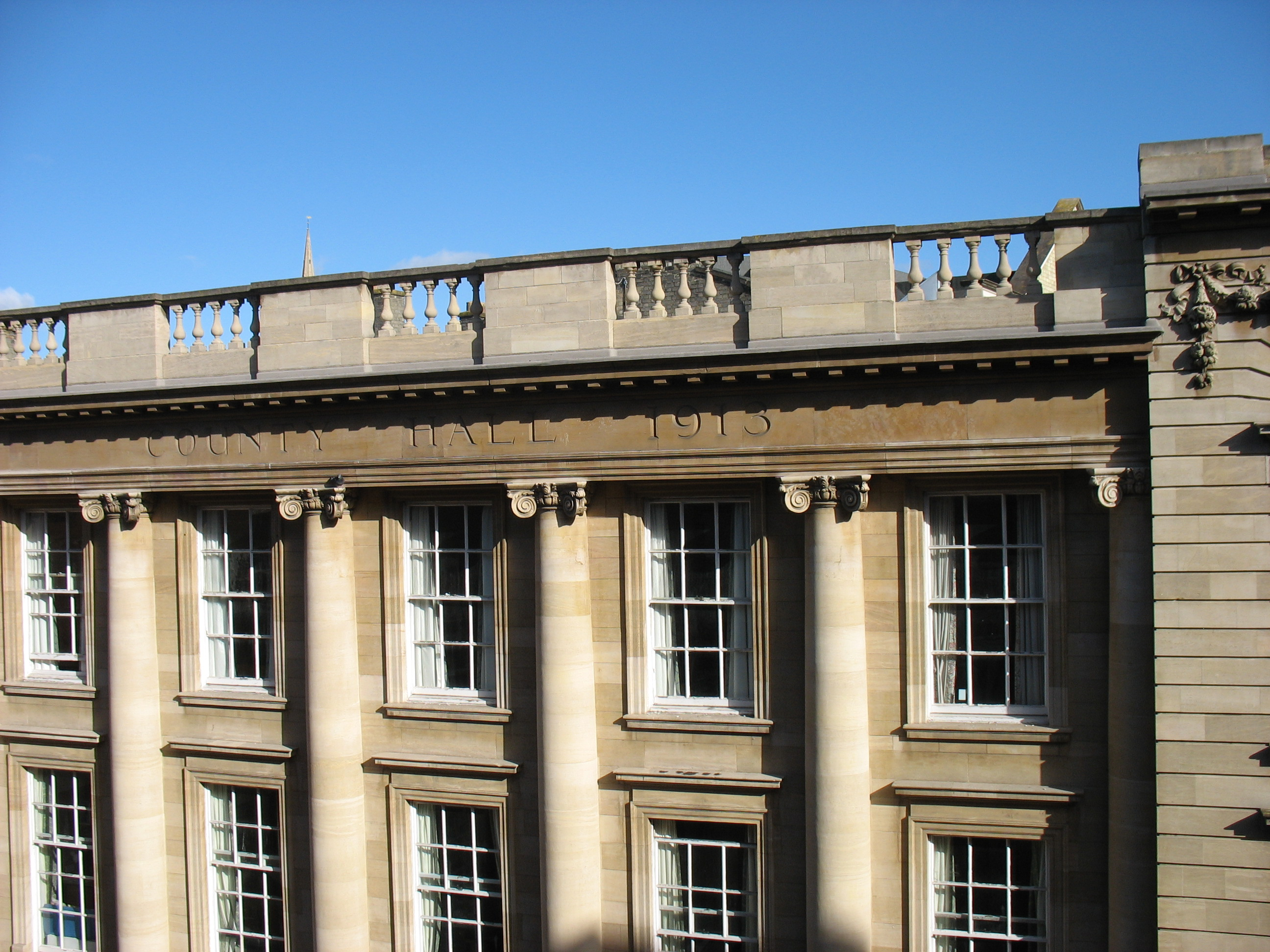
The old Cambridgeshire County Hall

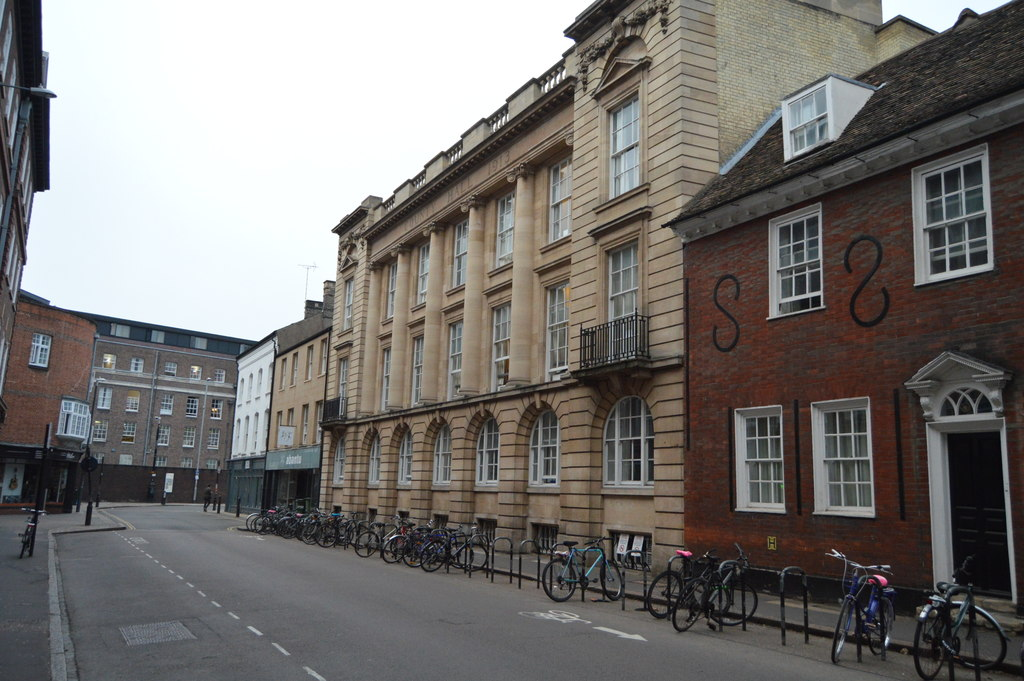
old County Hall, Hobson Street

- College of Arts and Technology, Collier Road, 1909. The original building.
- County Hall, Cambridge, 1913–14.

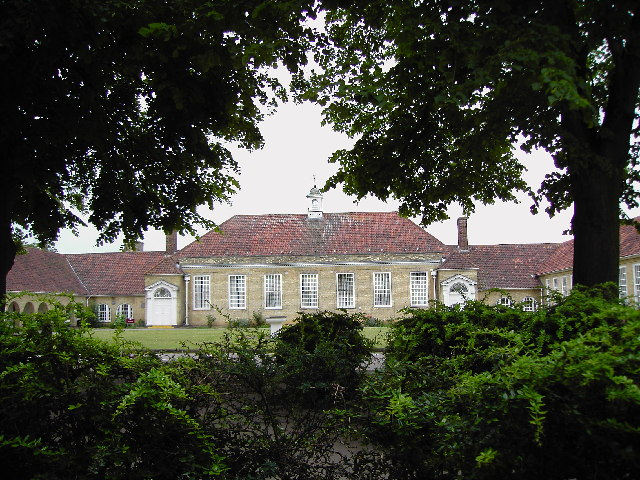
Sawston Village College

- Sawston Village College. 1930. The earliest of the Cambridgeshire village colleges, in Neo-Georgian style with the sprawling type of plan that was to be developed in the later colleges.
- Shire Hall, Cambridge, A large Neo-Georgian building in yellow brick. 1931–2.
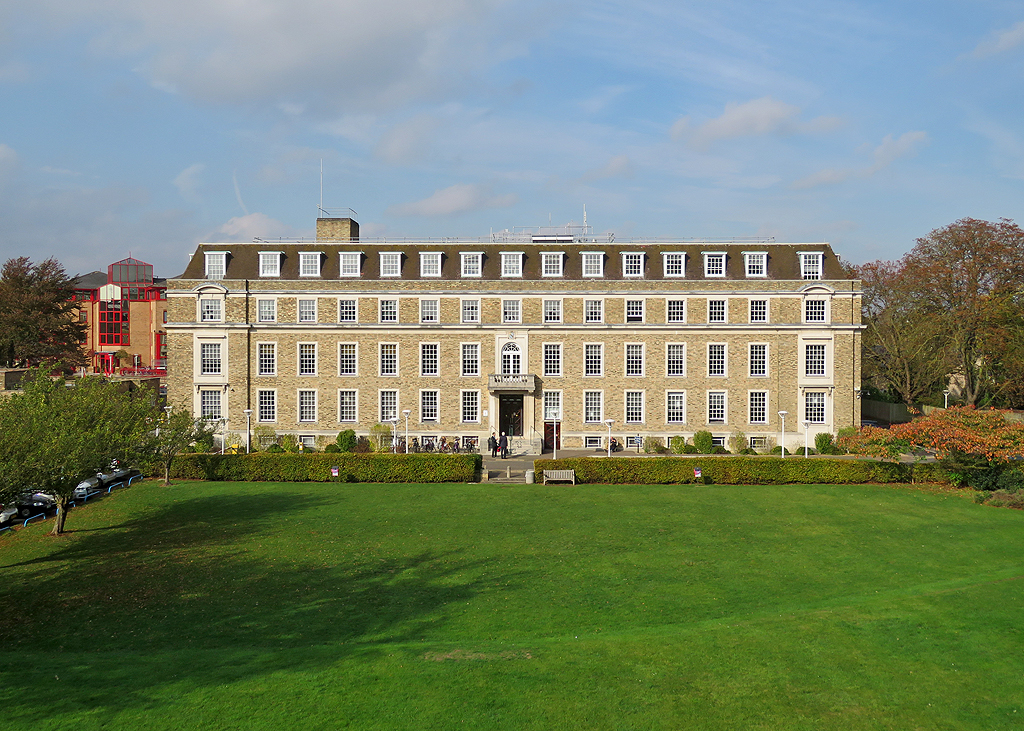
  Cambridge: Shire Hall

== Literature ==
- Antram N (revised), Pevsner N & Harris J, (1989), The Buildings of England: Lincolnshire, Yale University Press.
- Brodie A. (ed), Directory of British Architects, 1834–1914: 2 Vols, British Architectural Library, Royal Institute of British Architects, 2001.
- Pevsner N (1970), 2nd ed. The Buildings of England: Cambridgeshire, Penguin, London.
