= Augustus Frederic Scott =

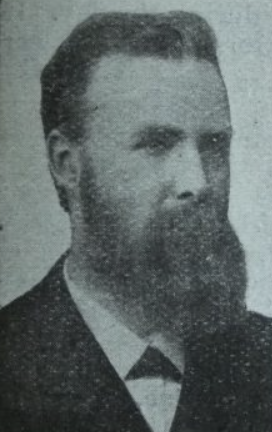
- Born: Augustus Frederic Scott; 1854; Rockland St Peter; Norfolk; England
- Died: 1936 (aged 81–82); Norwich, England
- Occupation: Architect
- Practice: A F Scott and Sons

Augustus Frederic Scott (1854–1936) was a Norwich-based architect and Primitive Methodist. His work included both civic and ecclesiastical buildings, in addition to several large hotels and many private commissions.

== Personal life ==
Scott was born in the Breckland village of Rockland St Peter, Norfolk. His father was Primitive Methodist minister Jonathan Scott. Following the completion of his training he settled in Norwich where he opened up his own practice. His two sons joined him in the business in 1912. Scott was a very principled man. He was a practising Primitive Methodist and a strict teetotaller. He was also a strict vegetarian for ethical reasons and a Sabbatarian. He disagreed with paying the part of his local government rates which funded Church of England schools and when bailiffs removed his paintings, he would buy them back again. As a Primitive Methodist he also became a local preacher and enthusiastic cyclist, he travelled thousands of miles by bicycle and even cycled to London for business on several occasions. He also, at his own expense, maintained a Chinese missionary in Western China. In 1920, he became embroiled in a dispute with Percy Carden, the minister at Scott Memorial Church. As a result of the dispute Scott and his family permanently severed relations with the church that was named after his father.

== Career ==
In 1877 following the arrival of the railway to the North Norfolk town of Cromer. Scott operated a practice in Cromer to exploit the building boom on the North Norfolk coast at that time. He designed many of the now listed and important unlisted buildings in Cromer such as the Baptist and Methodist Chapels, the Cliftonville Hotel, Eversley Hotel, the churchyard wall and a number of shops and houses on Church Street and Cliff Avenue.

== List of works ==
This list is incomplete

=== Norfolk ===
Cromer
Ecclesiastical

- 1910 Methodist Church & Church Hall, West St

Private

- 1893 25 Cliff Avenue, Three storey villa.
- 1894 Cliftonville Hotel for William Churchyard of Westbourne House, West Street, Cromer
- 1895 30 Cliff Avenue, Three storey villa.
- 1896 Seafields, 14–16 Cliff Avenue, pair of semi-detached houses.
- 1897 Home Farm Lodge, Hall Road. Built for the trustees of the late John Bond Cabbell of Cromer Hall.
- 1898 21 Mount street, Shop with accommodation above, designed for Mr Randell. When first built there was a large clock attached to the front.
- 1899 Marlborough House, 4 Cliff Avenue, a private dwelling now flats.
- 1900 Kingsmead, 11 Cliff Avenue. Private dwelling
- 1900 Ruth House, 23 Cliff Avenue.
- 1900 Tudor House, 6 Cliff Avenue. The Prince of Wales is believed to have stayed here during the early 20th century.
- 1901 Haverhill House, 13 Bond Street, designed as a shop and bakehouse.
- 1902 Woolwich House (formally Co-operative store), Prince of Wales Rd. Shop with accommodation above.
- 1903 Eversley Hotel, Prince of Wales Road. Built for Misses Burton.
- 1903 Ashbourne House, Cabbell Road. A former Hotel owned by Alex Javis, who, at one time owned the Hotel de Paris.
- 1904–1905 Cliff Mansions, originally 'West Lawn', later 'Seafield', 24 Cliff Avenue.
- 1905 Beech House, 29 Church Street, designed as a Three storey house with shops in the ground floor
- 1905 Mutimer's department store, now the Indoor market, Garden St.
- 1908 No. 33–39 St James Street in King’s Lynn listed by The Victorian Society on its 'at risk register' who describe is as an "extraordinary early example of modernist design and concrete construction"

Public

- 1890 Cromer Churchyard Boundary Wall.
- Unknown date Wooden shelter and raised paths, West Promenade, by Melbourne toilets.

Norwich

- 1912 Buntings Department Store, St Stephens Street

Ecclesiastical

- 1902 Scott Memorial chapel, Thorpe Road. The building has now been converted into suites of offices
- 1904 Potters House Church, Dereham Road

=== Cambridgeshire ===
- 1923 Castle Street Methodist Church

== Gallery ==
Buildings and structures of A F Scott

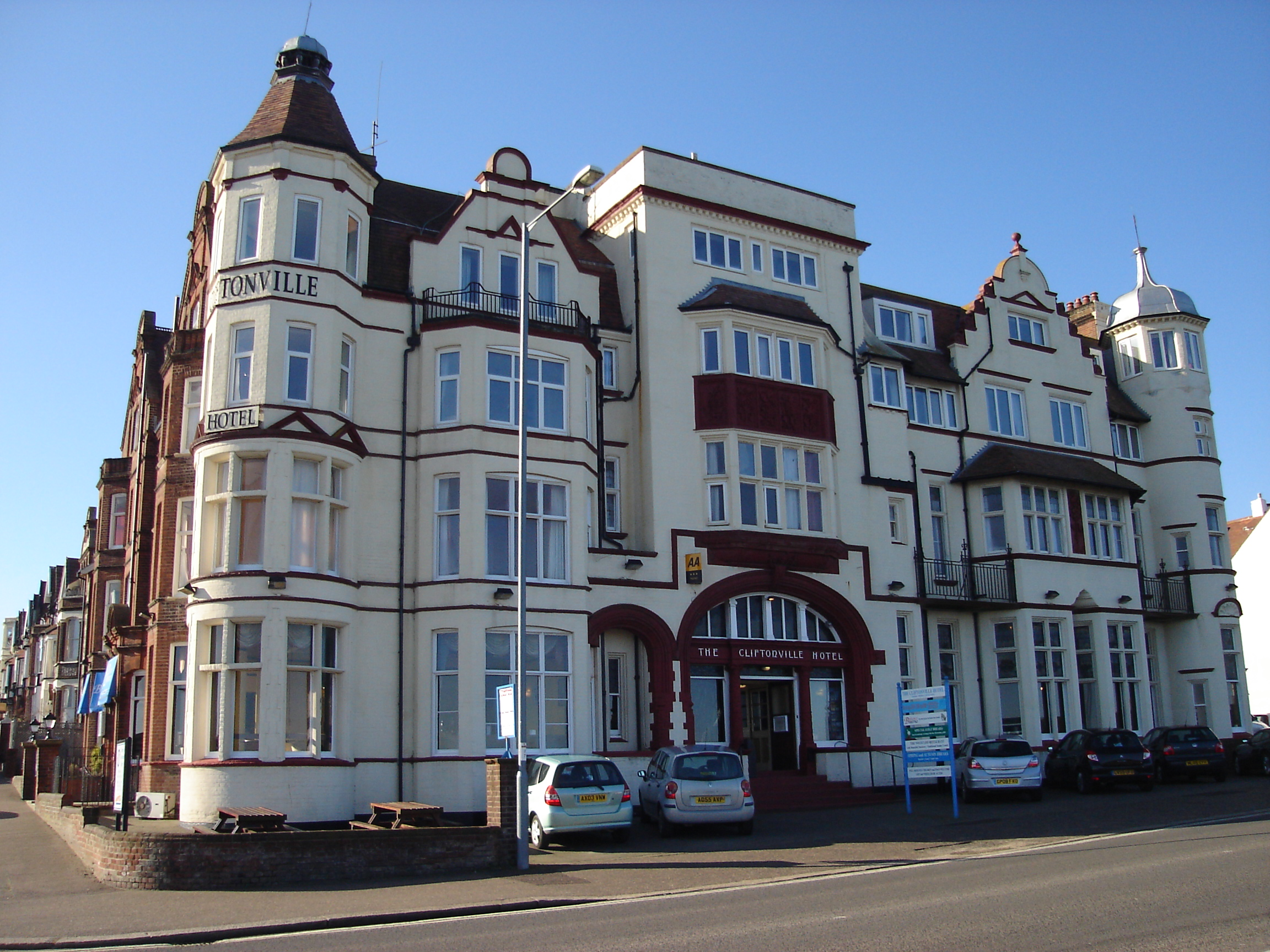
Cliftonville Hotel, Cromer

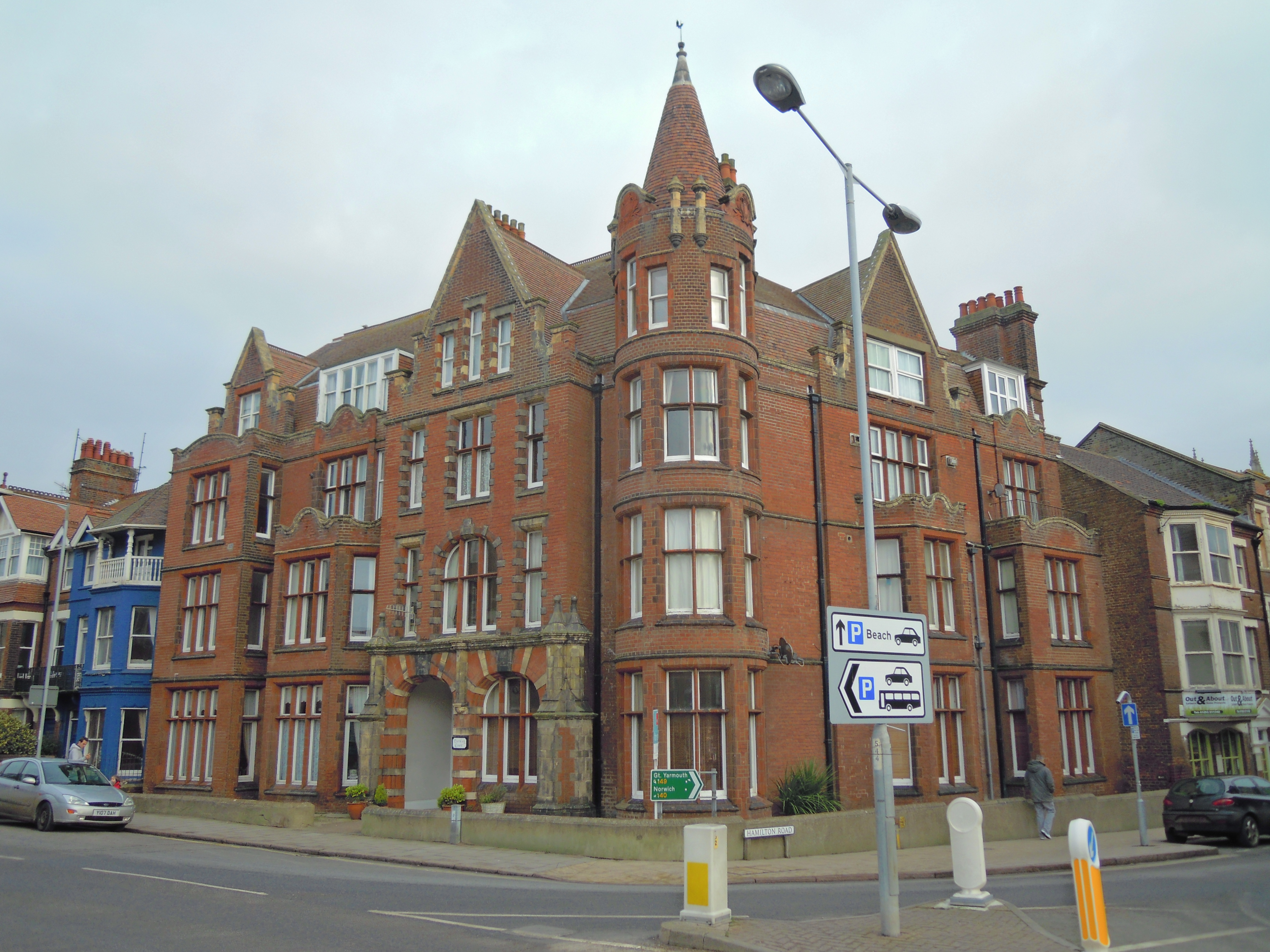
Eversley Hotel, Prince of Wales Road, Cromer.

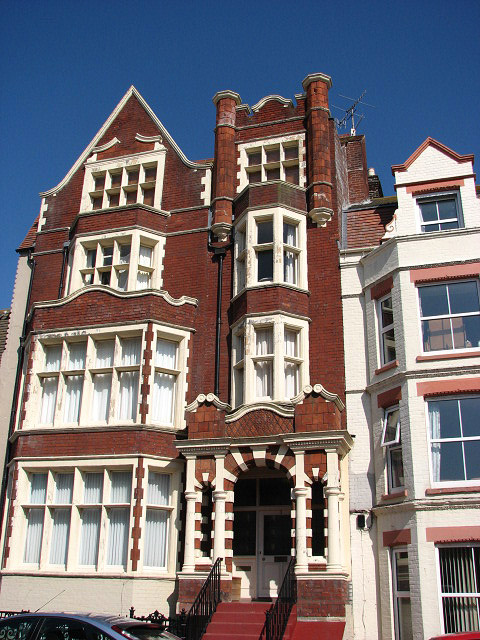
Ashbourne House, Cabbell Road, Cromer.

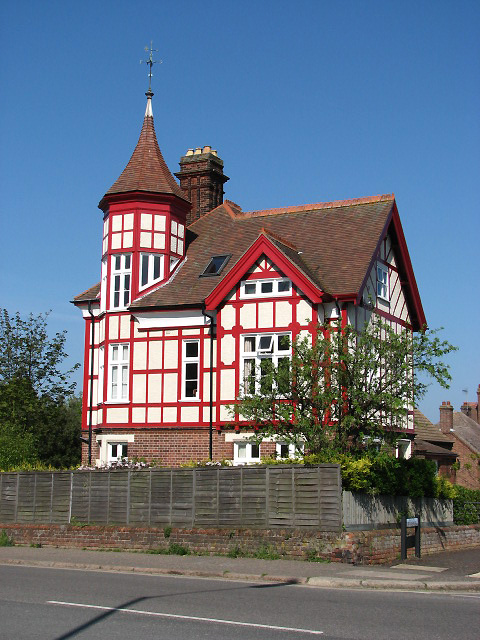
30 Cliff Avenue, Cromer

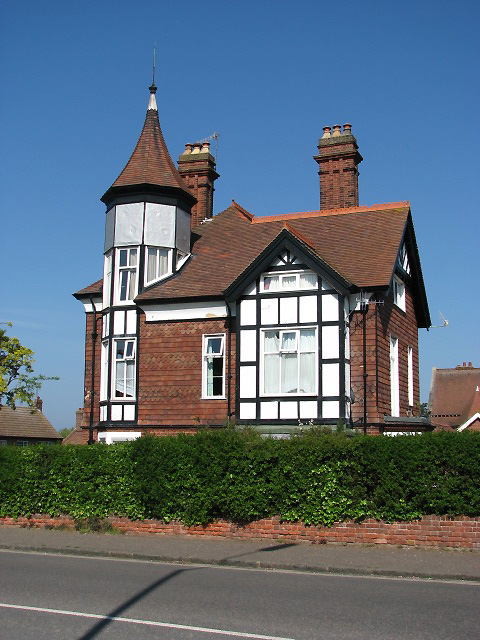
25 Cliff Avenue, Cromer

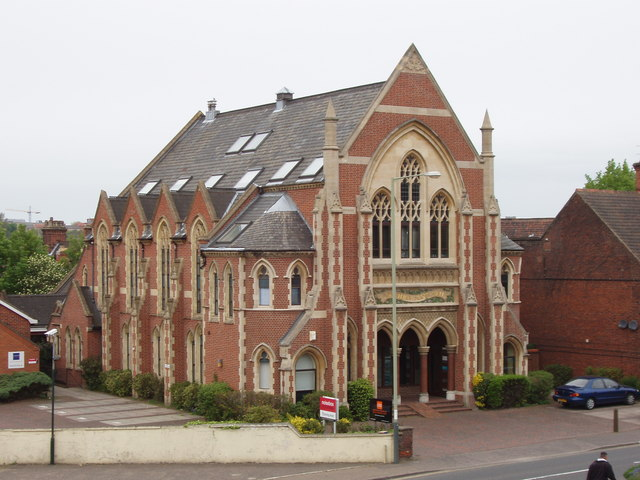
Jonathan Scott Hall, Norwich

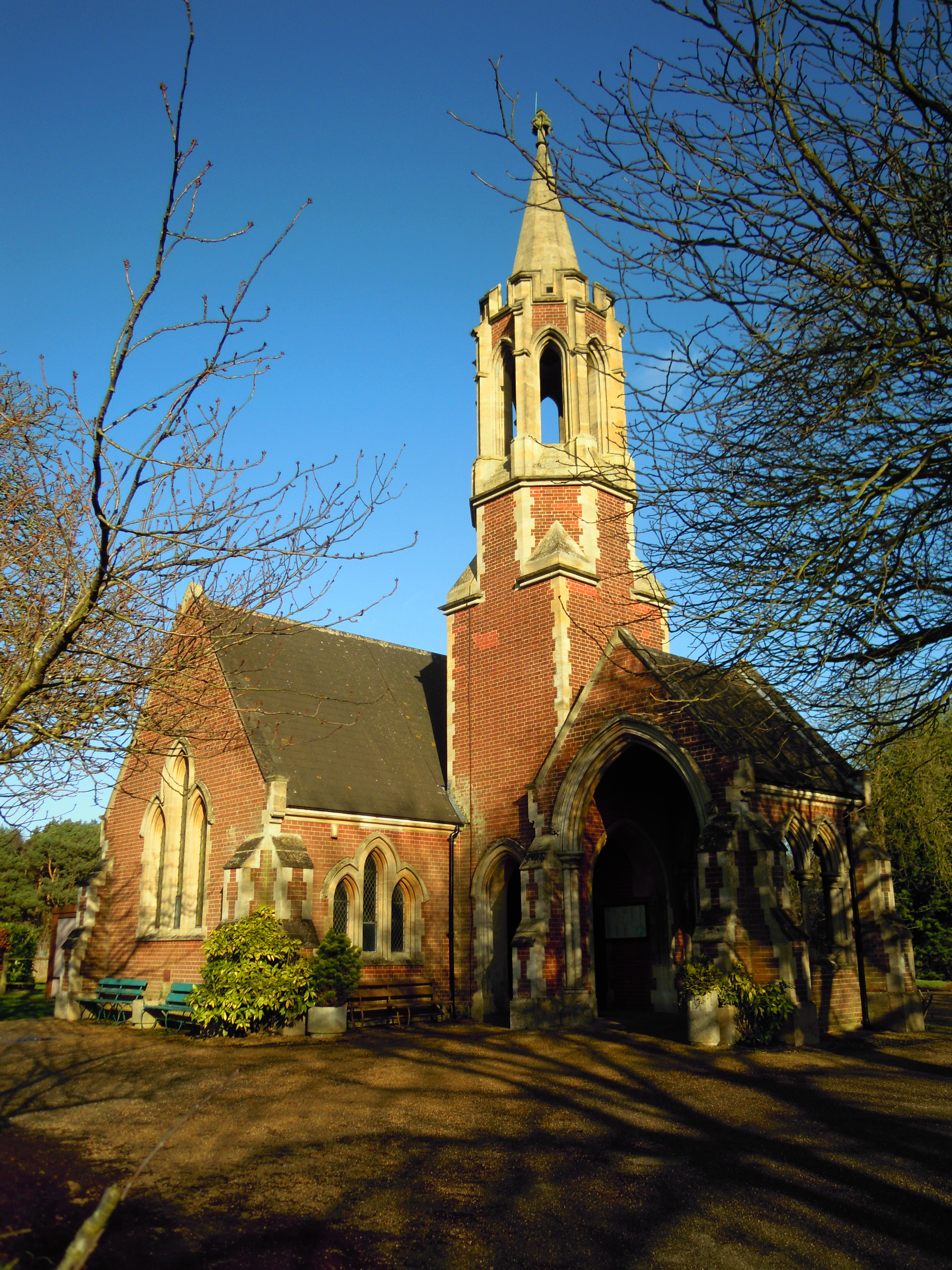
Chapel in Cromer cemetery.

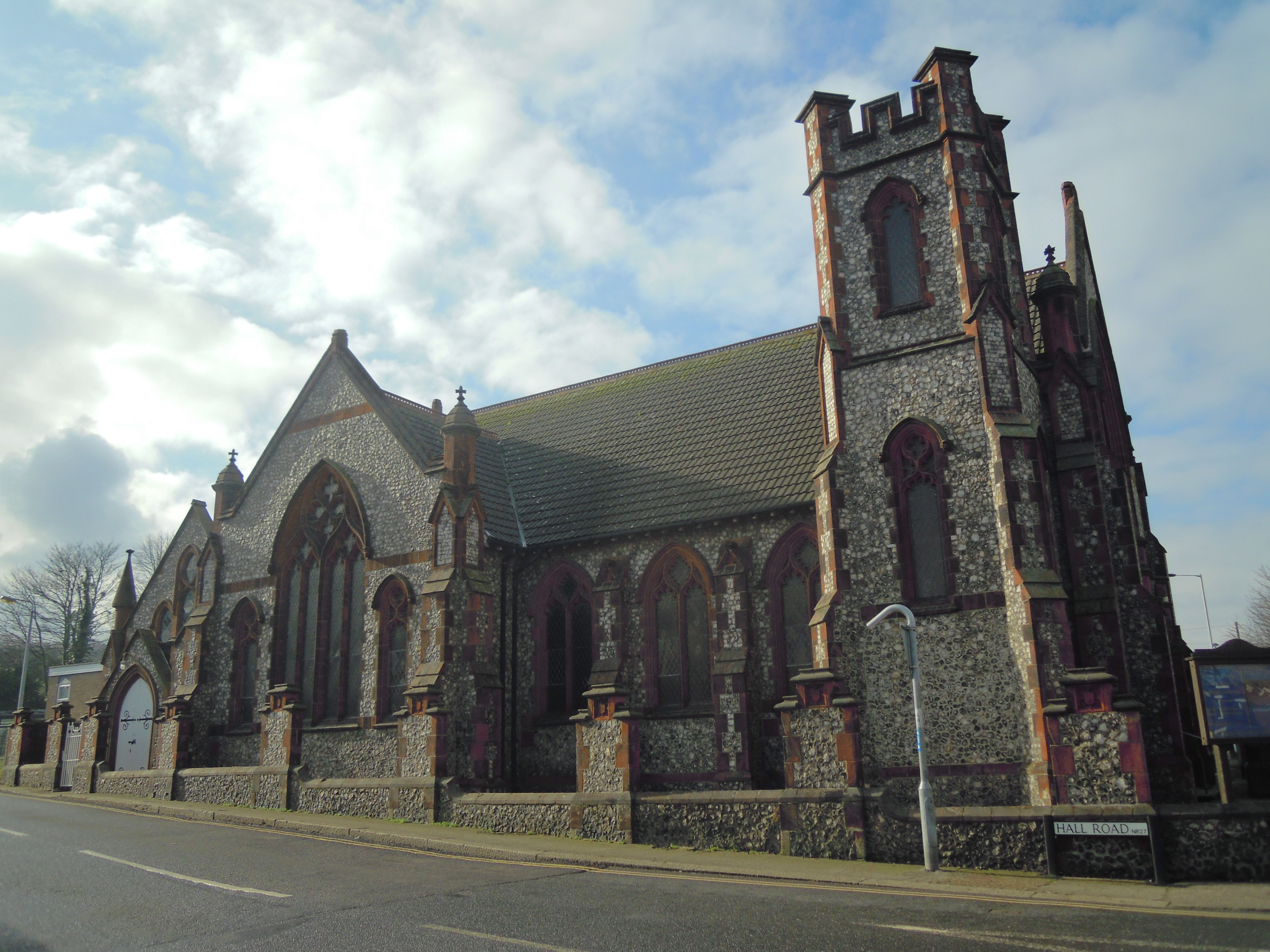
Cromer Methodist Church

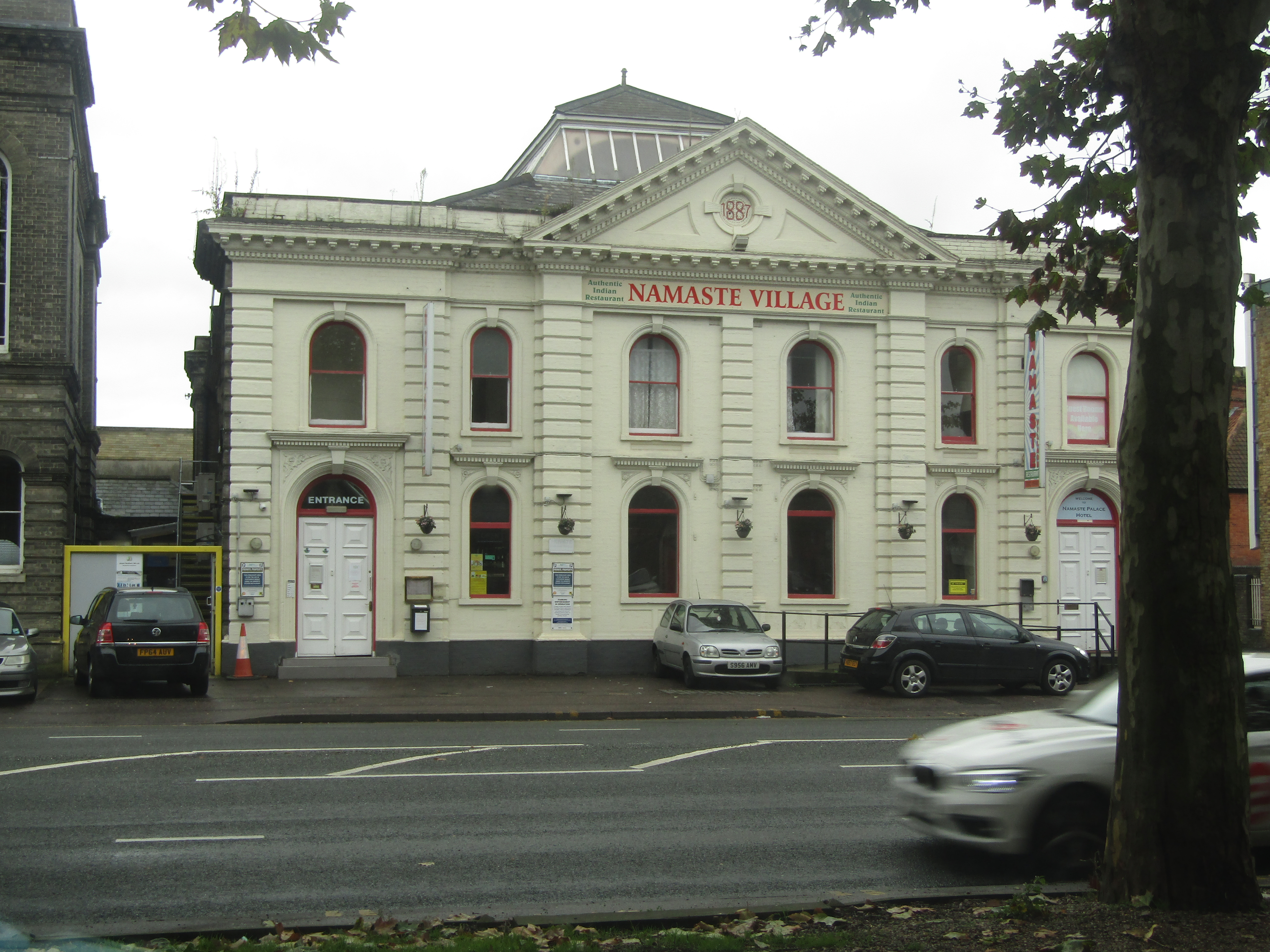
Queen's Road Primitive Methodist Church and Sunday School

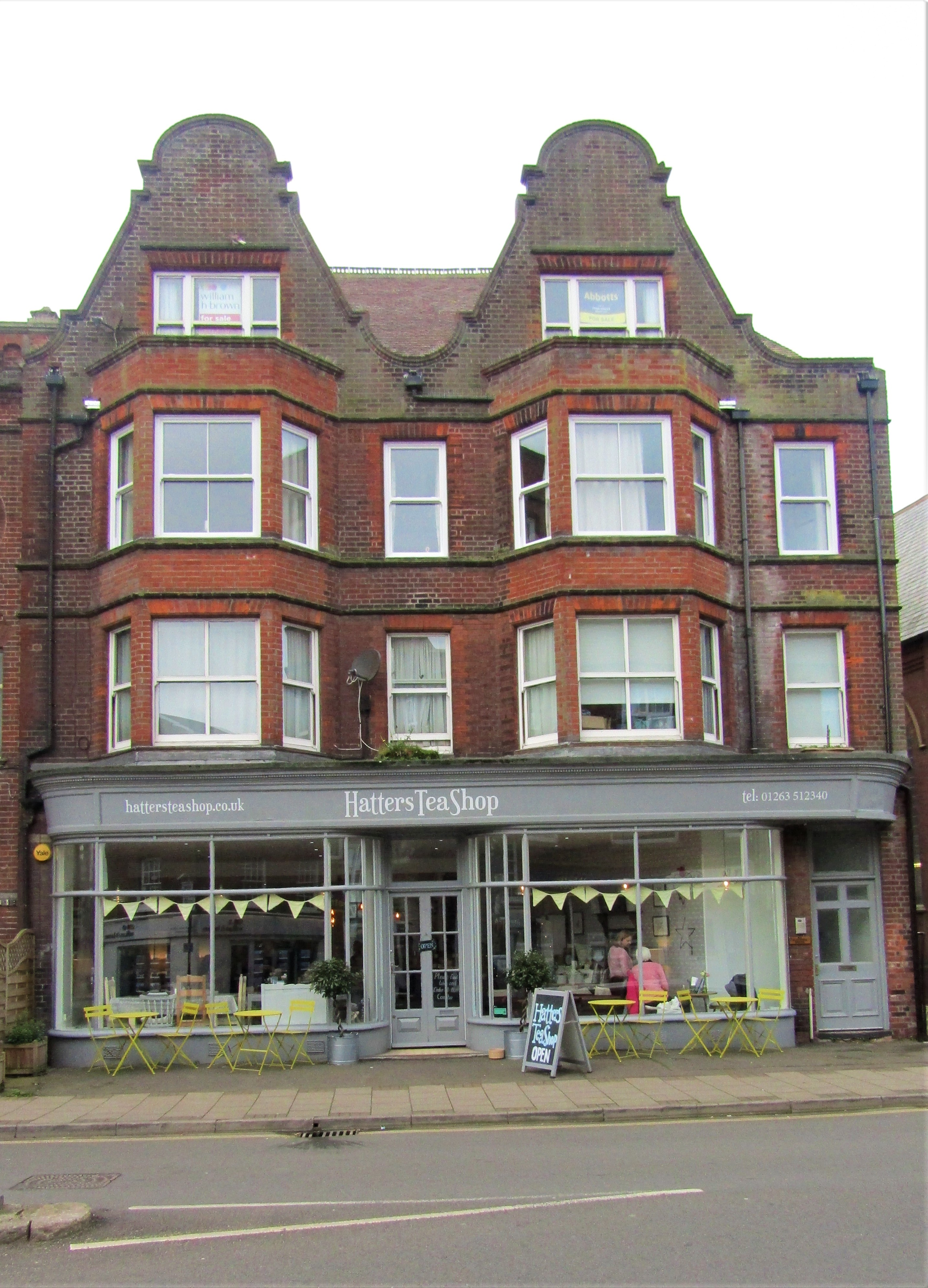
Woolwich House, Prince of Wales Road, Cromer

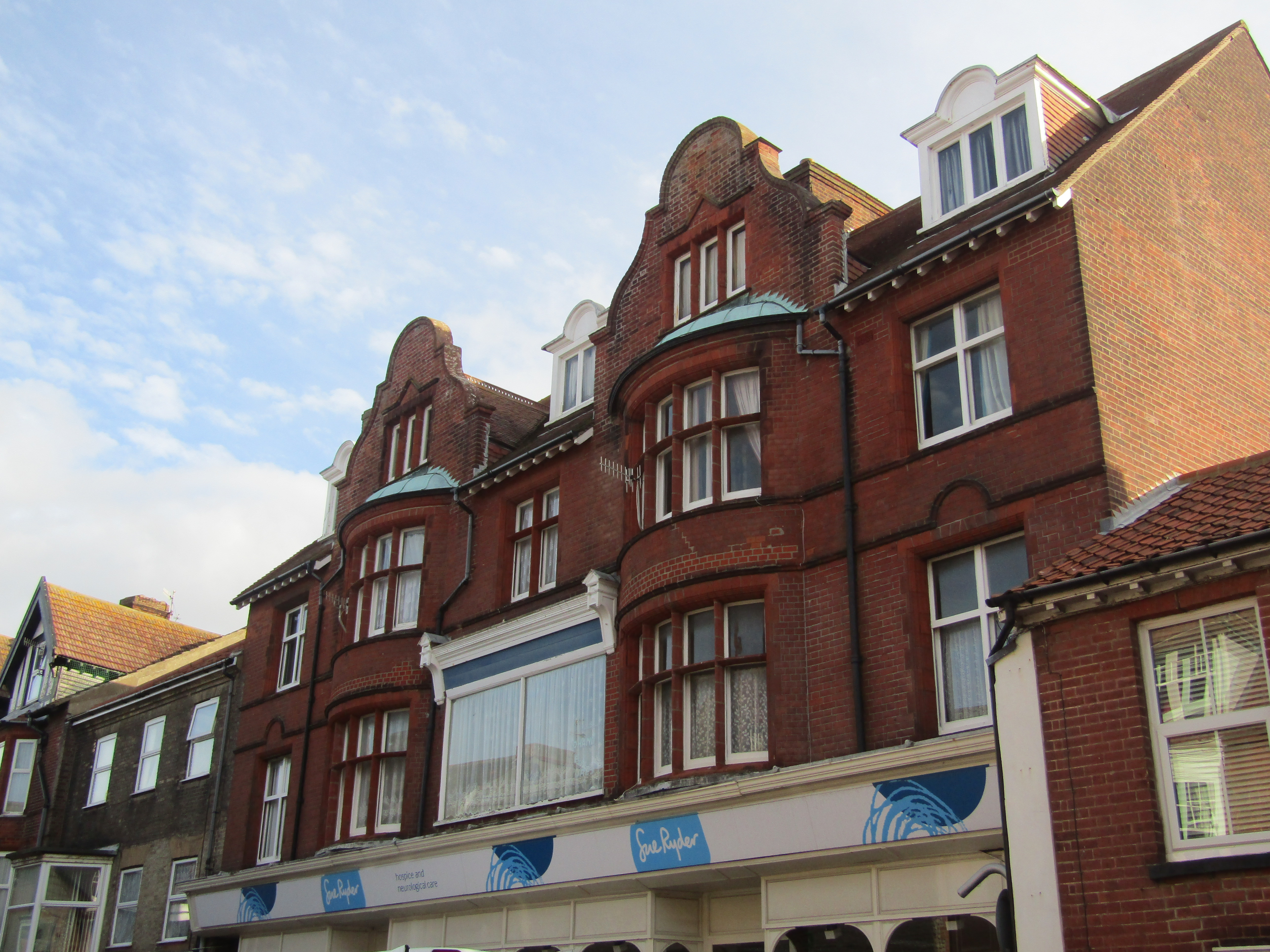
Former Mutimer's department store, Garden Street, Cromer

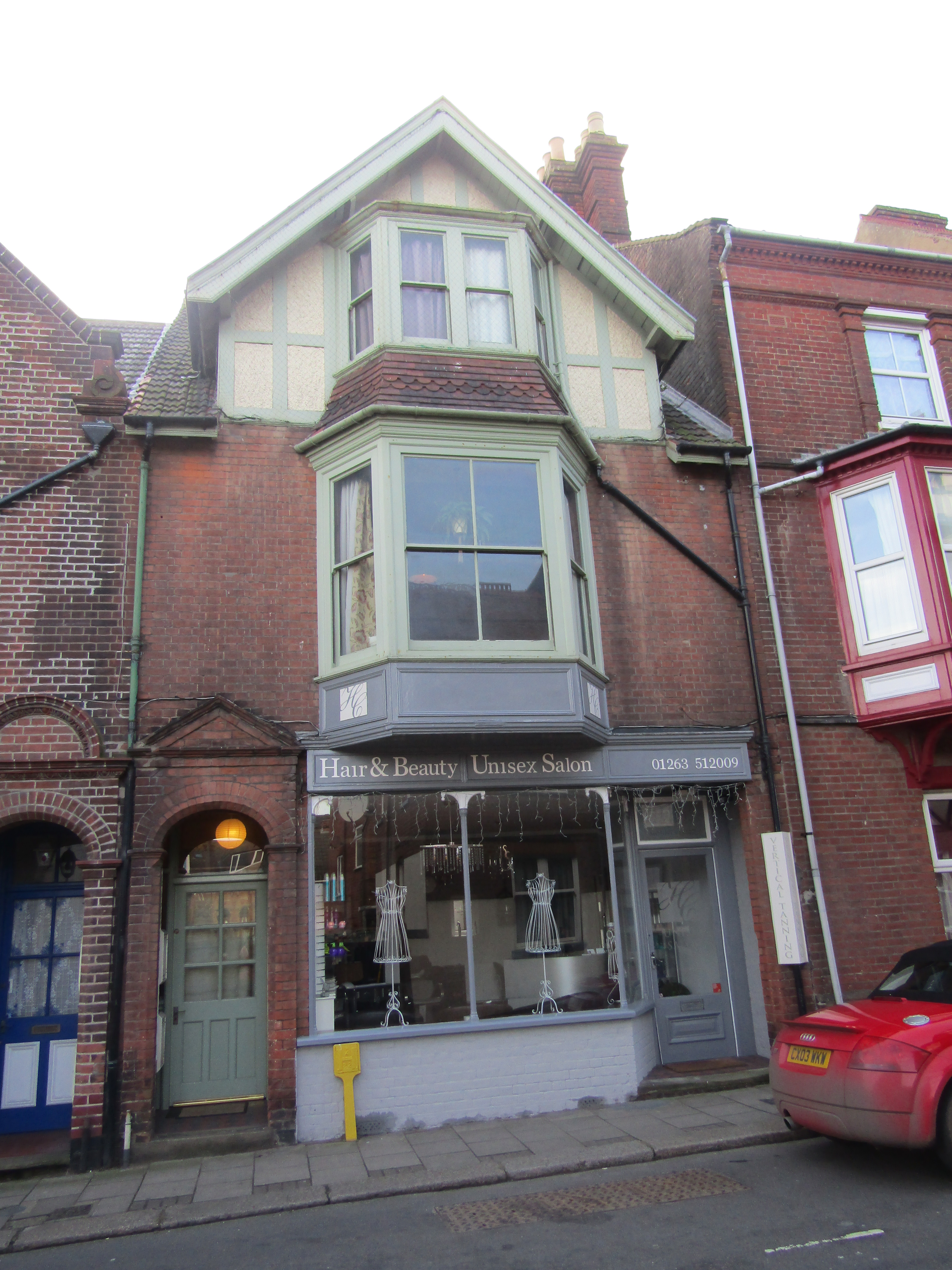
No. 21 Mount Street, Cromer
