= Ploughman series =

Irish banknotes

£1 Ploughman note distributed by the Bank of Ireland in 1932

The Ploughman series was a series of Irish banknotes issued by the Currency Commission of Ireland as a transitional measure for eight Irish banks: Bank of Ireland, Hibernian Bank, Munster & Leinster Bank, National Bank, Northern Bank, Provincial Bank of Ireland, Royal Bank of Ireland and Ulster Bank. They were initially issued between 6 May and 10 June 1929 as part of an arrangement to get the banks to withdraw their previous individual banknote issues. As part of the arrangement the banks would refrain from issuing their own notes in future. The commission instead issued their collective notes.

The notes were referred to as the ploughman series because they an image of a ploughman ploughing a field with a horse-drawn plough.

The notes, which were denominated in notes for £1, £5, £10, £20, £50 and £100, used as the back images a collection of images of Ireland, in order the Custom House, Dublin, St. Patrick's Bridge, Cork, Currency Commission Building, Foster Place, Dublin, the Rock of Cashel, Croagh Patrick, and Killiney Bay, County Dublin.

The last issue was in 1941. The notes were finally withdrawn on 31 December 1953.
