= Castle Hill, Cambridge =

Hill in Cambridge, England

Coordinates: 52.2128°N 0.1128°E

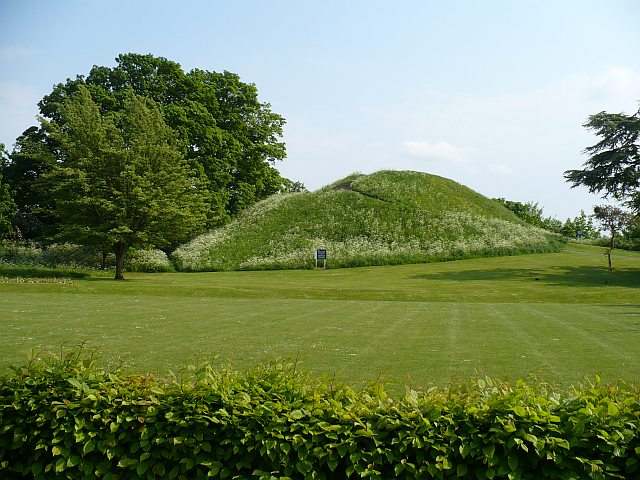
Castle Mound, all that remains of Cambridge Castle on Castle Hill

Castle Hill in Cambridge, England, is located in the Castle ward of the city. Cambridgeshire County Council's former headquarters, Shire Hall, are located directly adjacent to Castle Hill.

== History ==
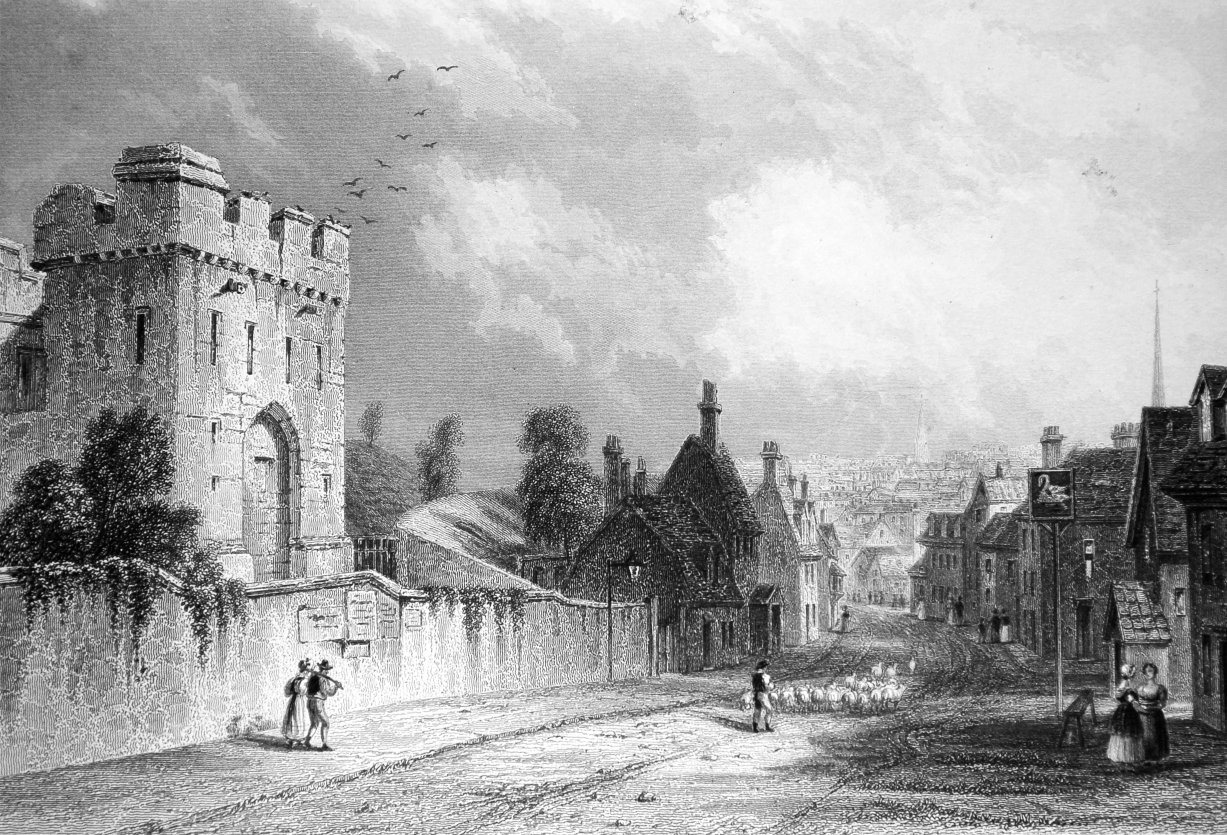
View down Castle Street with the Cambridge Castle gate from Memorials of Cambridge by Le Keux (1845)

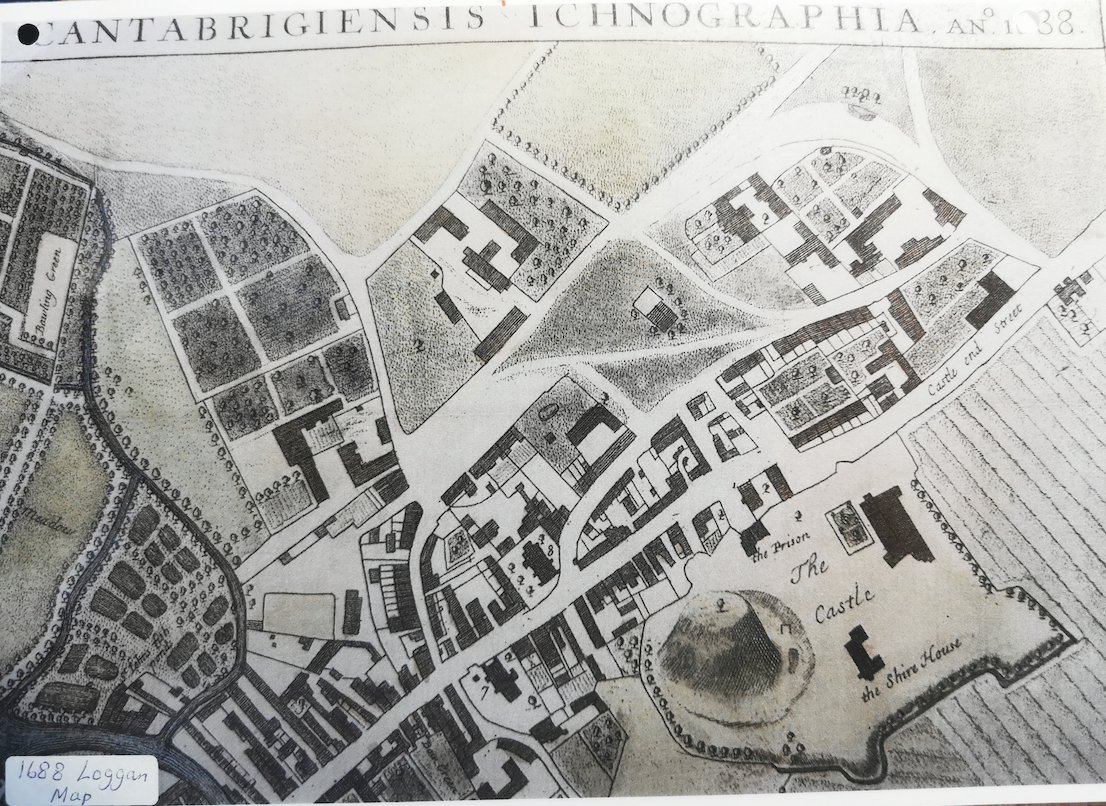
1688 map

The hill is the site of the original settlement, north of the River Cam. There is evidence of pre-Roman activity, but the Romans created a town called Duroliponte here. It was a convenient place to cross the river. At the time it was at the head of the navigable part of the river, then known as the River Granta. St Peter's Church, located halfway up the hill, has some pieces of Roman tile in its walls.

In the Anglo Saxon period, the hill was used for defence. In 1068, the Normans built Cambridge Castle on the hill. The castle is no longer extant; only the castle mound and some groundworks remain.

== See also ==
- Castle Street, southwest of Castle Hill
- Honey Hill, also to the southwest
