= Shire Hall, Cambridge =

County building in Cambridge, Cambridgeshire, England

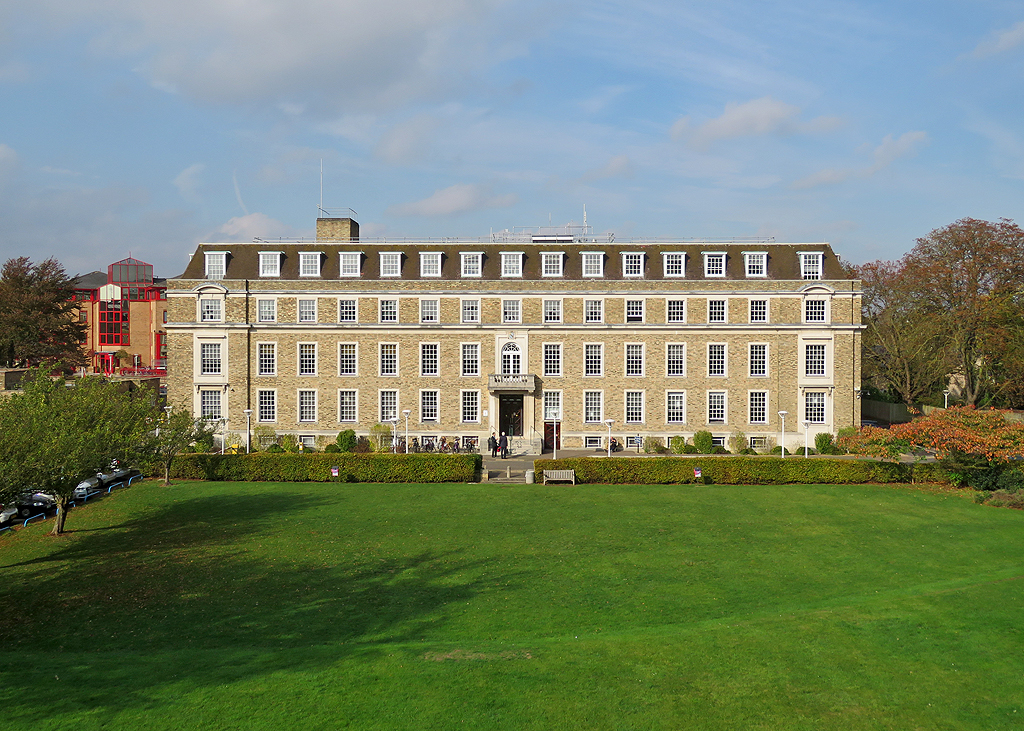
- Shire Hall in 2018

- Location within Cambridgeshire

General information
- Architectural style: Neo-Georgian style
- Location: Castle Hill, Cambridge, United Kingdom
- Coordinates: 52.2130°N 0.1141°E
- Completed: 1932

Design and construction
- Architect: Herbert Henry Dunn

Shire Hall is a former municipal building in Castle Hill in Cambridge, Cambridgeshire, England. It was the headquarters of Cambridgeshire County Council from 1932 until 2021, when the council moved to New Shire Hall at Alconbury Weald, some 23 miles from Cambridge.

== History ==
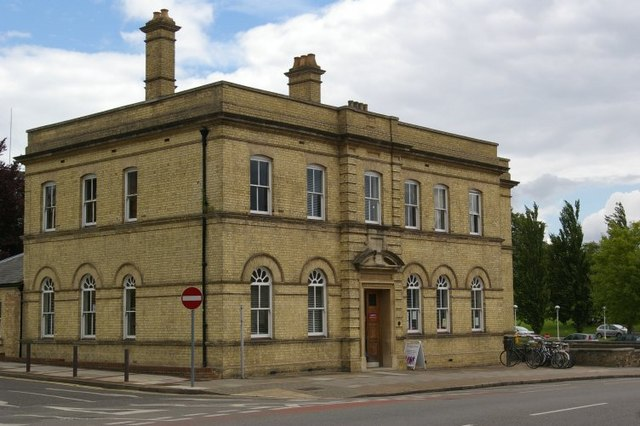
The former police station

An earlier shire hall was completed in the grounds of the old Cambridge Castle on Castle Street in 1843, serving as the county's main courthouse. The building stood directly on the Castle Street frontage, with a police station adjoining. Much of the remainder of the castle site to the rear was used for a prison.

Meanwhile, County Hall in Hobson Street served as the meeting place of Cambridgeshire County Council. After deciding that the Hobson Street building was too small, county leaders chose to procure a new building; the site they selected was the former prison site behind the existing shire hall courthouse. The bricks from the old prison were recycled for construction of the new shire hall but the police station was retained and converted for additional office use.

The new building, which was designed by Herbert Henry Dunn in the Neo-Georgian style, was completed in 1932, with the council's first meeting in the building being held on 23 July 1932. The design involved a symmetrical main frontage with fifteen bays facing south towards the Castle Hill mound; the central bay featured a doorway flanked with pilasters on the ground floor; there was a stone balcony and a window with a fanlight on the first floor. Internally, the principal room was the council chamber in the centre of the building on the first floor. The building was set back from Castle Street, standing behind the 1843 courthouse. The 1843 building was demolished in the early 1950s and its site incorporated into the gardens in front of the new shire hall.

An office building known as "The Octagon", because of its shape, was added to the north of the main building in the 1960s and a bunker for use as an emergency planning centre in the event of a nuclear attack was completed in 1989.

In December 2017, as part of a cost-saving scheme, the county council announced plans to move to a smaller purpose-built facility at Alconbury Weald; the proposal was approved by the full county council in May 2018. In May 2019 the county council announced that it would give the developer, Brookgate, a lease of up to 40 years to develop the site for hotel and office accommodation: the terms of the lease would require the developer to provide continued public access to the Castle Mound. The costs of moving the data centre were subsequently estimated at nearly £7 million.

Construction work on the New Shire Hall at Alconbury Weald started in December 2019. The final committee meeting to be held at Shire Hall was on 12 March 2020. Meetings were then held online due to the COVID-19 pandemic for the rest of 2020 and first part of 2021, during which time the council vacated Shire Hall and moved to New Shire Hall, with the first committee meeting at New Shire Hall being held in September 2021.
