= Eversley Hotel, Cromer =

Building in Norfolk, England

Eversley Hotel
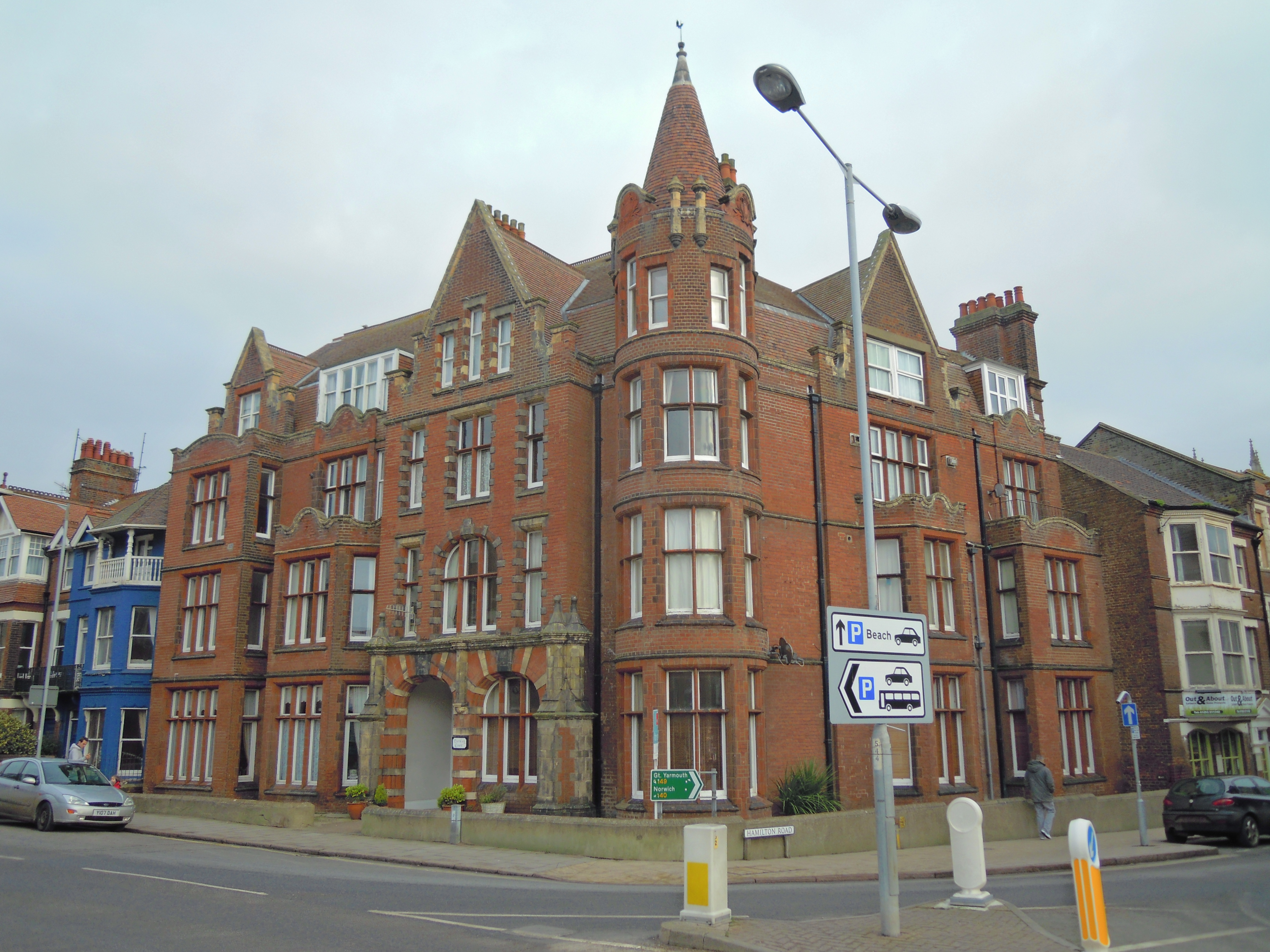

- Norfolk

General information
- Location: Cromer, North Norfolk, Norfolk, England, Prince Of Wales Road; Cromer; NR279HR; Norfolk
- Coordinates: 52°55′54.05″N 1°17′53.34″E
- Opening: 1903

Technical details
- Floor count: 4

Design and construction
- Architect: Augustus Frederic Scott

The Eversley Hotel was a former hotel in the English seaside resort town of Cromer in the county of Norfolk. The hotel closed its doors shortly after the Second World War, and is now used as residential flats and is called Eversley Court.

== Location ==
The building is on the western side of the town centre on the corner of Hamilton road and Prince of Wales road (A149 coast road), with its main façade facing Prince of Wales Road.

== Description ==
The building has been designed in the Queen Anne style and stands over four floors. It is built in red brick with corner turret, terracotta detailing and stone dressing details. The main entrance to the hotel was on Prince of Wales road and is constructed from red and buff ornamental brickwork. Some time during the inter-war years the cast iron and glass covered entranceway was removed.

== History ==
Following the arrival of the railway into Cromer in 1877 (Cromer High station) and 1887 (Cromer Beach station), wealthy London lawyer, Benjamin Bond Cabble of Cromer Hall proposed that land on the western outskirts of the town, be used to develop the town and attract wealthy holiday makers from the south east to Cromer. He proposed that the land, which he had acquired be sold off in lots and used to develop residences, hotels and holiday homes for these expected wealthy visitors. The Eversley hotel was part of this scheme and was constructed between 1902 and 1903 and was built for Misses Burton who instructed Norwich architect Augustus F Scott to design their new hotel. Scott was also the town surveyor and had been involved in overseeing the new western development scheme since 1887. The hotel opened for business in 1903 at the height of Cromer's very short golden era of as a fashionable holiday destination for the wealthy Edwardian holiday makers, which lasted up until the time of the First World War. A long slow decline began from then. During the Second World War the War Office commandeered the hotel, along with many of the others in Cromer, to billet troops sent to this part of the coast to guard against the threat of Invasion. The Eversley, like many of these hotels did not fare well and had been badly abused by the troops. After the war had finished the town was left with an abundance of run down hotels. To make matters worse, holiday makers began making their way to countries with warmer climates. Like many others the Eversley was closed down. Several of the hotels including the Grand, Albany, and the Metropole were demolished. The Eversley survived and was converted into residential flats.
