= James Sandby Padley =

English surveyor, architect and civil engineer

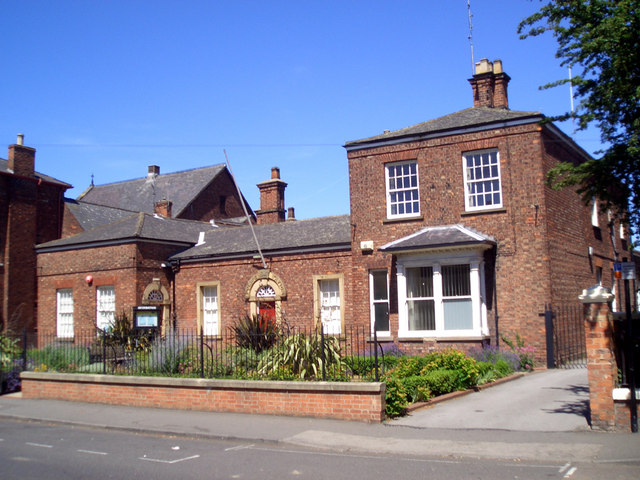
- The Old Police Station, High Street, Barton on Humber by J.S.Padley.
- Born: 1792; Mablethorpe, Lincolnshire, England
- Died: 1881 (aged 88–89); Skegness, Lincolnshire, England
- Occupation: Architect

James Sandby Padley (1792-1881) was an English surveyor, architect and civil engineer who worked in Lincoln, England. He was county surveyor for the Parts of Lindsey, Lincolnshire from 1825 to 1881, and was also noted for his interest in antiquarian studies.

== Career ==
Padley claimed to have been the illegitimate son of the Rev. Charles Sandby, the younger son of a wealthy London banker, who lived in Partney, Lincolnshire between 1791 and 1794, having been "rusticated" from Oxford for having had an affair, and Elizabeth Padley, daughter of Richard and Elizabeth Padley (née Hill) of East Kirkby. Padley received training as a surveyor under Captain Stevens of the Royal Engineers between 1819 and 1820 while working on the initial survey of the Ordnance Survey in Lincolnshire. He then undertook the survey of the estates of Charles Chaplin near Louth and this was followed by surveys of the Temple Bruer Estate and Blankney Fen for Chaplin. Followed the death of William Hayward, probably in 1825, Chaplin was to recommend him for the post of Surveyor for County Bridges of the Parts of Lindsey and Surveyor of Sewers for the Lincoln District. He was to hold these positions until his death in 1881. He also became surveyor to the Lincoln Turnpike Trusts. Padley worked from premises at 29 Broadgate, Lincoln. Before his death he had been in partnership with James Thropp. Thropp continued the practice until 1901, when he was joined by George Robinson Harding. The practice then continued as Thropp and Harding.

== Surveys and publications ==
Padley produced a number of the Enclosure Awards

- 1830-2 He produced the Reform Act plan of Lincoln, based on Ordnance Surveyors' Drawings of 1820 to 1835:
- Municipal Corporations Act plan of Lincoln, published 1837-1839
- Plan of the City of Lincoln. In 1842 Padley published his remarkable Large Map of Lincoln, a map of such high quality that it matched anything in the country. Dedicated To Sir Edward Bromhead Bart. This plate of the City of Lincoln is most respectfully dedicated by his most obliged and faithful servant James Sandby Padley, Surveyor 1842. 4 sheets each 595×520 by John Dower in London on a scale of approx. 110 yard to 1 inch. The second edition of this plan was 1868.
- In 1882 Padley's book The Fens and Floods of mid-Lincolnshire, with a description of the river Witham was published in 1882, This specifically records floods from the Trent which affected Lincoln in the eighteenth and early nineteenth centuries as well as the improvements to river Witham to make it navigable.

=== Antiquarian Interests ===
Padley collected of topographical papers and formed a collection of antiquities including Roman amphorae, pottery and a sword). He also showed his skill as an artist in a variety of commissions, and his drawings of the Witham Shield and Newport Arch are noteworthy. From the 1840s he completed accomplished sketches of a number of old buildings in the county. In later life his business success appears to have limited the time Padley devoted to his antiquarian interests, although a few days before his death in 1881, he completed the manuscript for his major work The Fens and Floods of mid-Lincolnshire, with a description of the river Witham, in its neglected state before 1762, and its improvements up to 1825, which was published the following year. In 1851 he published Selections from the Ancient Monastic, Ecclesiastical and DomesticEdifices of Lincolnshire. This contains meticulous drawings of seven Medieval Lincolnshire buildings. These were The Greyfriars or Mechanics Institute in Lincoln, St Benedict's Church in Lincoln, the Vicars Choral Buildings in the Lincoln Minster yard, Monk's Abbey in Lincoln, the Whitefriars, High Street, Lincoln, Somerton Castle and Temple Bruer Preceptory. The engraved prints in this publication are invaluable for the amount of information they contain about the state that they were in at the time, and particularly for the half-timbered Whitefriars, which has been much altered.

== Works include ==
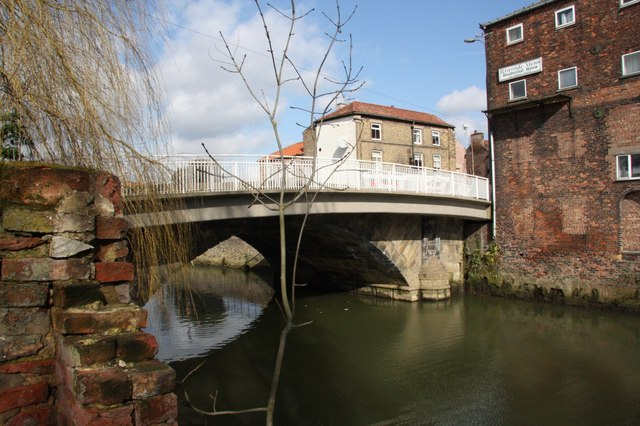
County Bridge over the river Ancholme at Brigg, Lincolnshire

- County Bridge over the Ancholme, Brigg. Listed Grade II. Dated 1828. Foundation stone said to be inscribed with names of J S Padley of Lincoln, county surveyor, Geo Willoughby of York, mason and contractor and W T Leake of Louth, clerk of the Works. Single span rusticated stone arch with modern handrail of 1951. Semi-circular buttresses at either side, below niches.
- County Bridge at Fulnetby.
- County Bridge at Market Rasen
- Former Police Station and Magistrates Court - High Street. Barton on Humber. The old police station and magistrates court was designed by J. S. Padley and built in 1847 (the date is above the main door). The police station was the building to the right and the magistrates court the building to the left.
- Former Police Station and Magistrates Court - Market Rasen. Similar design to Barton, different layout. 1849.
- The Sessions House, Ramsgate, Louth. c.1850.
- Police Station and Petty Sessions Court, Epworth, Lincolnshire.1848.
- Several other Police Stations in the County of Lindsey including probably Binbrook.

== Literature ==
- Antonia Brodie (ed), (2001), Directory of British Architects, 1834–1914: 2 Vols, British Architectural Library, Royal Institute of British Architects,
- Mills D A and Wheeler R C Historic Town Plans of Lincoln, 1610–1920, Lincoln Record Society. Vol 92.
- Padley J.S., (1851) Selections from the Ancient Monastic Ecclesiastical and Domestic edifices of Lincolnshire, Lincoln.
- Padley J.S., (1851), The Fens and Floods of mid-Lincolnshire, with a description of the river Witham, in its neglected state before 1762, and its improvements up to 1825. With maps, plans, &c.
- Wheeler R. C. (2004) J S Padley as an Antiquary, Lincolnshire History and Archaeology: Journal of the Society for Lincolnshire History and Archaeology. No39.
