= Barton-upon-Humber Police Station =

Former Police Station, Barton-upon-Humber
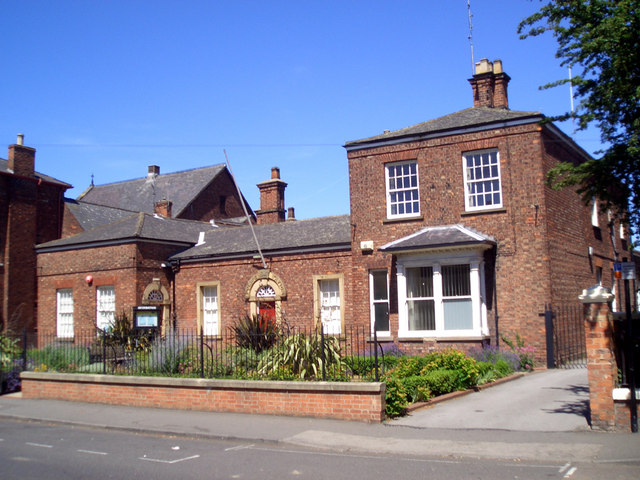

- Location in Lincolnshire
- 53.684950°N 0.43910076°W
- Location: 4 High Street, Barton-upon-Humber, North Lincolnshire, DN18 5PA, England
- OS grid reference: TA 03184 22075

History
- Built: 1847

Site notes
- Architect: James Sandby Padley

Listed Building – Grade II
- Designated: 17 September 1976
- Reference no.: 1054688

The Former Police Station, Barton-upon-Humber is a Grade II Listed building in Barton-upon-Humber, North Lincolnshire, England.

== History ==
The building was designed by the architect James Sandby Padley and constructed in 1847. It operated as a Police station and a Magistrate's court; the court closed in 1995 and the police station relocated to a different site in 2005. A blue plaque recording these events was erected on the building in 2007.

== Architecture ==
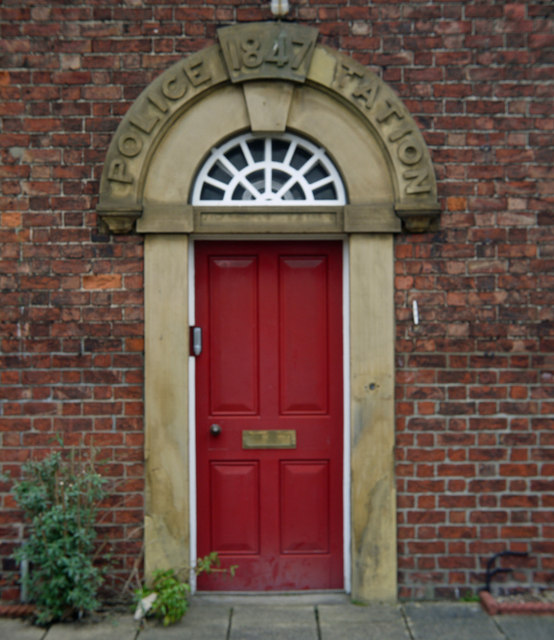

The original building was single-storied. The court room for the Magistrate was on the right and the accommodation for the constable on the left. It had two cells and ancillary rooms in its middle range. The bricks are locally sourced and the roof is Welsh slate.
