= George Padley =

English footballer

Personal information
- Date of birth: 1882
- Place of birth: Grimsby, England
- Date of death: 2 November 1965 (aged 82–83)
- Position: Forward

Senior career*
Years	Team	Apps	(Gls)
1902–1903	Albert Swifts		
1903–1904	Grimsby St John's		
1904–1906	Grimsby Town	14	(6)
1906	Grimsby St John's		
1906–1907	Worksop Town		
1907–1908	Denaby United		
1908–1911	Worksop Town		
1911–1912	Cleethorpes Town		
1912–1913	Goole Town		
1913	Cleethorpes Town		
1913–1915	Grimsby Rovers		
1915	Grimsby Town	4	(2)
1919–1920	Steam Trawler Co		
1920–192?	Charlton's		
- * Club domestic league appearances and goals

George Padley (1882 – 2 November 1965) was an English professional footballer who played as a forward.
