= Marcus Padley =

Australian stockbroker

Marcus Padley is an English-born stockbroker and writer. He currently resides in Melbourne, Australia.

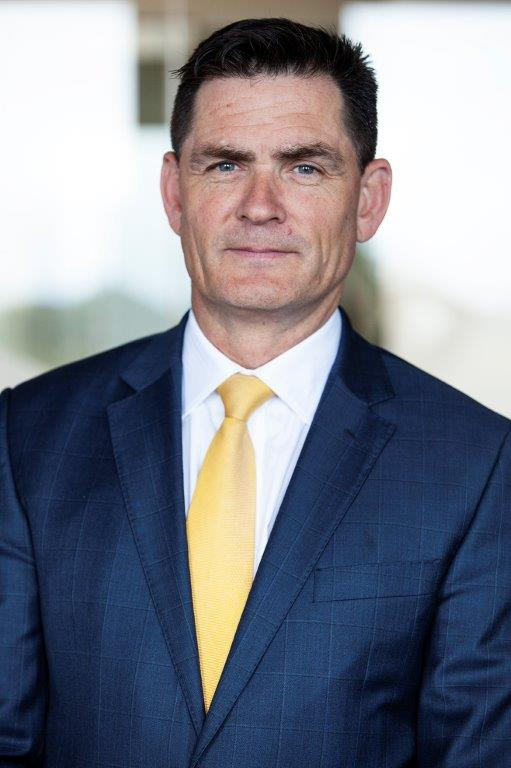
Marcus Padley founder of Marcus Today

Padley is originally from Yorkshire, England. He has a Master of Applied Finance from Macquarie University and a Bachelor of Law from Southampton University.

Padley started his career in institutional stock broking in London with Buckmaster & Moore in 1982. In 1994 he moved to Melbourne, where he worked for ABN AMRO. In 1998 he changed direction, moving into retail broking, servicing private clients. Padley felt there was a widespread ignorance about the industry, and in response in 1998 he started an email newsletter and website to educate clients and subscribers.

Padley is a prominent writer and commentator on issues related to the Australian Stock market. He regularly writes for a variety of Fairfax papers and often appeared as a 'talking-head' on the ABC Lateline business program. He writes a daily (user pays) stock market newsletter called Marcus Today.
