= Castle Street Methodist Church =

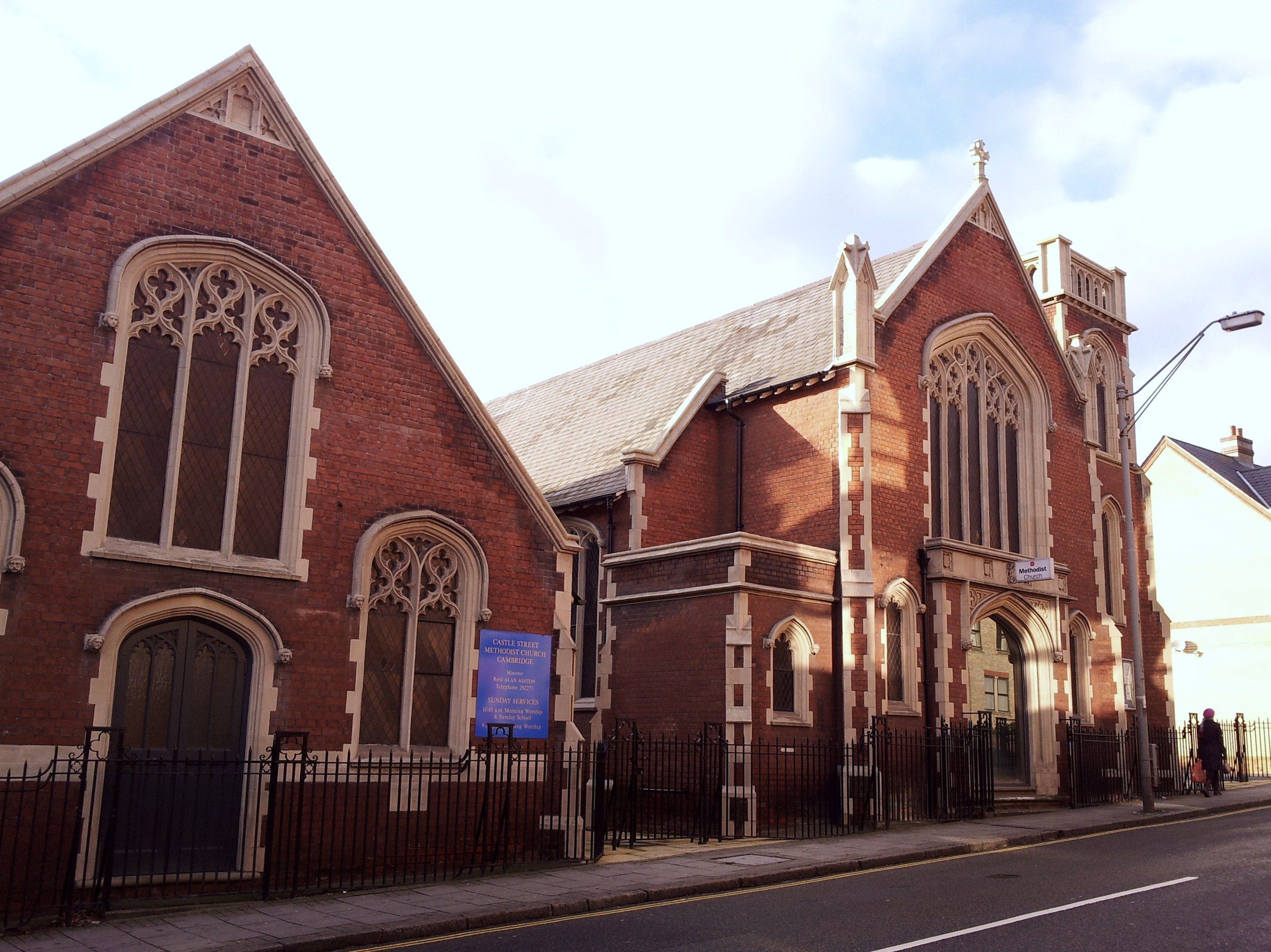
- Castle Street Methodist Church
- 52°12′41.5″N 0°6′49″E
- Location: Castle Street, Cambridge, Cambridgeshire, CB3 0AH
- Country: England
- Denomination: Methodist Church of Great Britain
- Previous denomination: Primitive Methodist Church
- Website: www.castlestreet.org.uk

History
- Founded: 1823

Architecture
- Functional status: Active
- Heritage designation: Grade II
- Designated: 1 May 2003
- Architect: Augustus Frederic Scott
- Style: Tudor Perpendicular style
- Years built: 1823, 1863, 1914

Specifications
- Capacity: 200

Administration
- District: East Anglia District

Castle Street Methodist Church is a Methodist church located on Castle Street, Cambridge, England.

Castle Street is one of thirteen churches in the Cambridge Methodist Circuit.

It is a working church with a morning service each Sunday at 10:00, and an evening service on the second Sunday of the month. There are 63 members and the ministers are The Revd J Pathmaraja and Deacon J Blackhall.

== Building history ==
The first church on the site was converted from a cottage by Primitive Methodists. The first purpose-built chapel constructed in 1823, then rebuilt in 1841 and in 1863. A completely new building, designed by Augustus Frederic Scott was built in 1914 and gained Grade II listed status in 2003.

In 2010 it underwent a major refurbishment which included improved accessibility, sound system and a new organ console, though with the original 1929 Binns organ being retained.

== Partnership ==
It is a member of the 'Church at Castle' ecumenical partnership with St Augustine's, St Giles' (Anglican), St Luke's (Anglican/URC) and St Peter's.
