= Barry Padley =

Australian rules footballer

Personal information
- Full name: Barry G. Padley
- Born: 22 October 1949 (age 77); Albert Park, Victoria
- Original team: Reservoir-Lakeside
- Height: 178 cm (5 ft 10 in)
- Weight: 76 kg (168 lb)

Playing career^{1}
Years	Club	Games (Goals)
1968–1978	Fitzroy	159 (94)
- ^{1} Playing statistics correct to the end of 1978.

Barry Padley (born 22 October 1949) is a former Australian rules footballer who played with Fitzroy in the Victorian Football League (VFL).

Padley was a utility, recruited from Diamond Valley Football League side Reservoir-Lakeside.

In his first season, he was badly injured in a game against St Kilda, puncturing a lung and breaking four ribs.

Padley kicked 24 goals in the 1971 VFL season, a career high.

He was a member of Fitzroy's 1978 night premiership team.

Padley coached Heidelberg in 1981 and 1982, winning their best and fairest award in the first of those years.
