= Alconbury =

Village in Cambridgeshire, England

Coordinates: 52.36°N 00.26°W

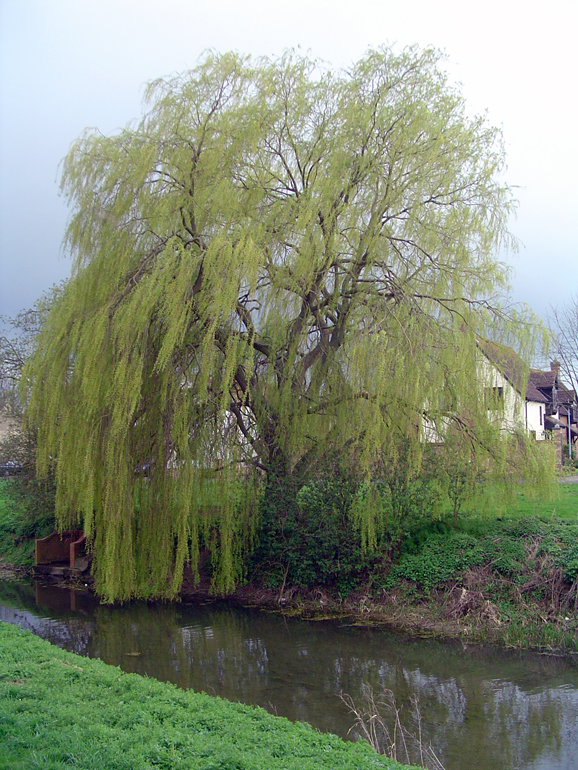
- A Weeping Willow in Alconbury, taken from across Alconbury Brook

- Location within Cambridgeshire
- Population: 1,569 (2011)
- OS grid reference: TL1875
- District: Huntingdonshire
- Shire county: Cambridgeshire
- Region: East
- Country: England
- Sovereign state: United Kingdom
- Post town: HUNTINGDON
- Postcode district: PE28
- Dialling code: 01480
- Police: Cambridgeshire
- Fire: Cambridgeshire
- Ambulance: East of England
- UK Parliament: Huntingdon

Alconbury is a village and civil parish in Cambridgeshire, England. Alconbury is situated within Huntingdonshire which is a non-metropolitan district of Cambridgeshire as well as being an historic county of England. Alconbury lies approximately 5 miles (8 km) north-west of Huntingdon.

== History ==
Alconbury was listed as Acumesberie and Almundeburie in the Hundred of Leightonstone in Huntingdonshire in the Domesday Book of 1086. There was one manor 17.5 households at Alconbury. The survey records that there were 18 ploughlands with the capacity for a further two, and 80 acres (32 hectares) of meadows.

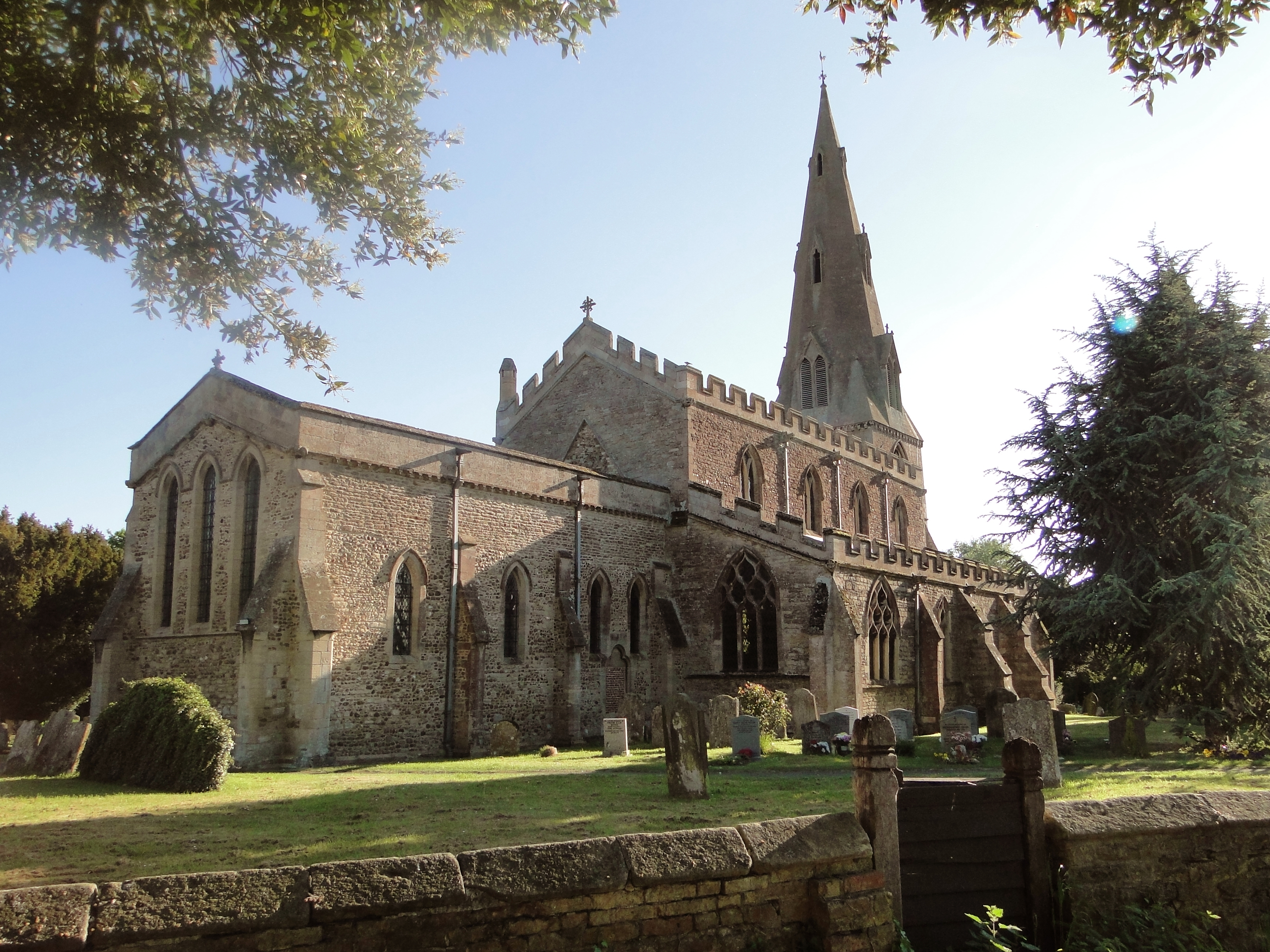
St Peter and St Paul's from outside

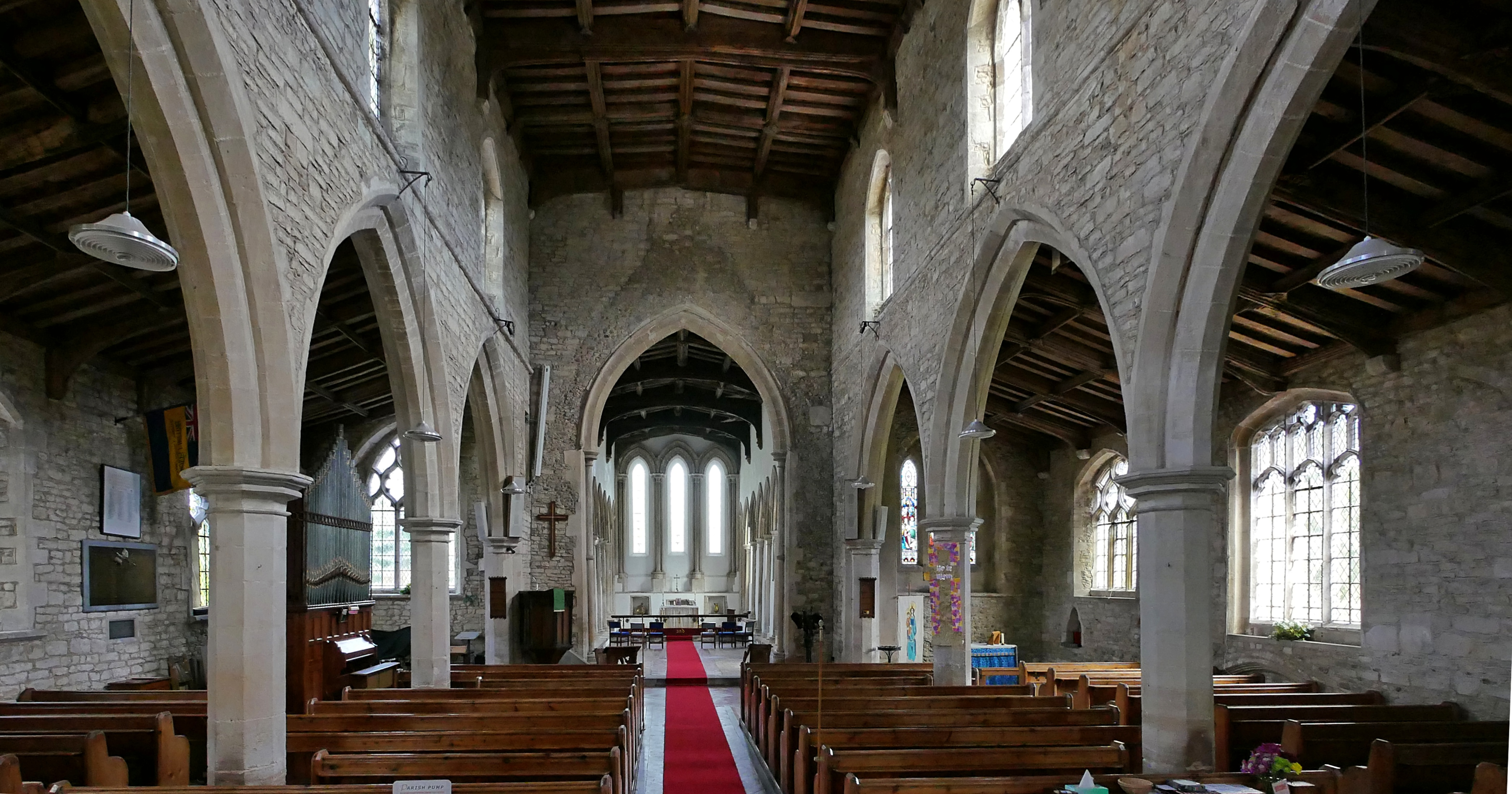
St Peter and St Paul's from inside

The church is dedicated to St Peter and St Paul. The Great North Road passed through the village and Alconbury Weston to the north-west. The A1 was dualled from Water Newton to Alconbury Hill in three stages in 1958. The £1.25 million 2-mile (3.2 km) A1 bypass opened in December 1964, joining the road at the point where it now meets the A1307 (former A604 and A14) at the junction at the top of a hill. It followed part of the former A604. In November 1998, the bypass was converted into the A1(M) which terminates next to the village. The former road is partly the B1043 which is also part of the former A14 and the rest of the former A1 to Peterborough. Units of the US Air Force were based at Alconbury from 1942 to 1945, and then from 1953 to 1995.

== Government ==
As a civil parish, Alconbury has its own elected parish council, made up of ten members. The second tier of local government is Huntingdonshire District Council which is a non-metropolitan district of Cambridgeshire. Alconbury is a part of the district ward of Alconbury and The Stukeleys and is represented on the district council by one councillor. The village's highest tier of local government is Cambridgeshire County Council. Alconbury is a part of the electoral division of Huntingdon and is represented on the county council by two councillors. Cambridgeshire County Council is now based near the village, in New Shire Hall, at Alconbury Weald.

At Westminster, Alconbury is in the parliamentary constituency of Huntingdon. The current MP is the Conservative Ben Obese-Jecty, who has represented the constituency since 2024.

Alconbury was in the historic and administrative county of Huntingdonshire until 1965. From 1965, the village was part of the new administrative county of Huntingdon and Peterborough. In 1974, following the Local Government Act 1972, Alconbury became a part of the county of Cambridgeshire.

== Geography ==
Alconbury is in the district of Huntingdonshire and gives its name to RAF Alconbury, as well as the new Alconbury Weald development, situated on the former airfield of RAF Alconbury. The village is near to the point where a major north–south trunk road, the A1, crosses the only major east–west trunk road: the A14. In 2005, there were proposals to convert the former airfield into a freight-only commercial airport to benefit from these surface links, however these proposals never came to fruition. Nearby, to the east, are The Stukeleys: Great Stukeley and Little Stukeley. Just north of the A1/A14 junction is Alconbury Hill.

== Demography ==
=== Population ===
In the period 1801 to 1901, the population of Alconbury was recorded every ten years by the UK census. During this time the population was in the range of 483 (the lowest in 1801) and 967 (the highest in 1851).

From 1901, a census was taken every ten years with the exception of 1941 (due to the Second World War).

| Parish | 1911 | 1921 | 1931 | 1951 | 1961 | 1971 | 1981 | 1991 | 2001 | 2011 |
|---|---|---|---|---|---|---|---|---|---|---|
| Alconbury | 518 | 523 | 492 | 733 | 629 | 748 | 1,131 | 2,440 | 1,670 | 1,569 |

All population census figures from report Historic Census figures Cambridgeshire to 2011 by Cambridgeshire Insight.

In 2011, the parish covered an area of 3,067 acres (1,241 hectares) and so the population density for Alconbury in 2011 was 327.4 persons per square mile (126.4 per square kilometre).

== Amenities ==
The village has a Neighbourhood Watch group, cricket club, football teams, community choir, a public house, a doctor's surgery, post office and Memorial Hall. There is a Church of England primary school. A service station on the B1043/A14 junction closed in August 2007 and re-opened in 2012 under new owners, however this has since been demolished and is now the site of a Maritime Transport Office and Depot.

There are several annual events held in the village including The Neighbourhood Watch Summer Fête, Village Show, Harvest Supper. Biannual events - Christmas tree festival, Scarecrow Festival, open gardens.
