= Stukeley (disambiguation) =

Stukeley is a surname.

Stukeley may also refer to:

- Great Stukeley, village in Cambridgeshire, England
- Little Stukeley, village in Cambridgeshire, England
- The Stukeleys, civil parish in the district of Huntingdonshire, in Cambridgeshire, England
