= Julian Huppert =

British politician (born 1978)

Julian Huppert FRSC
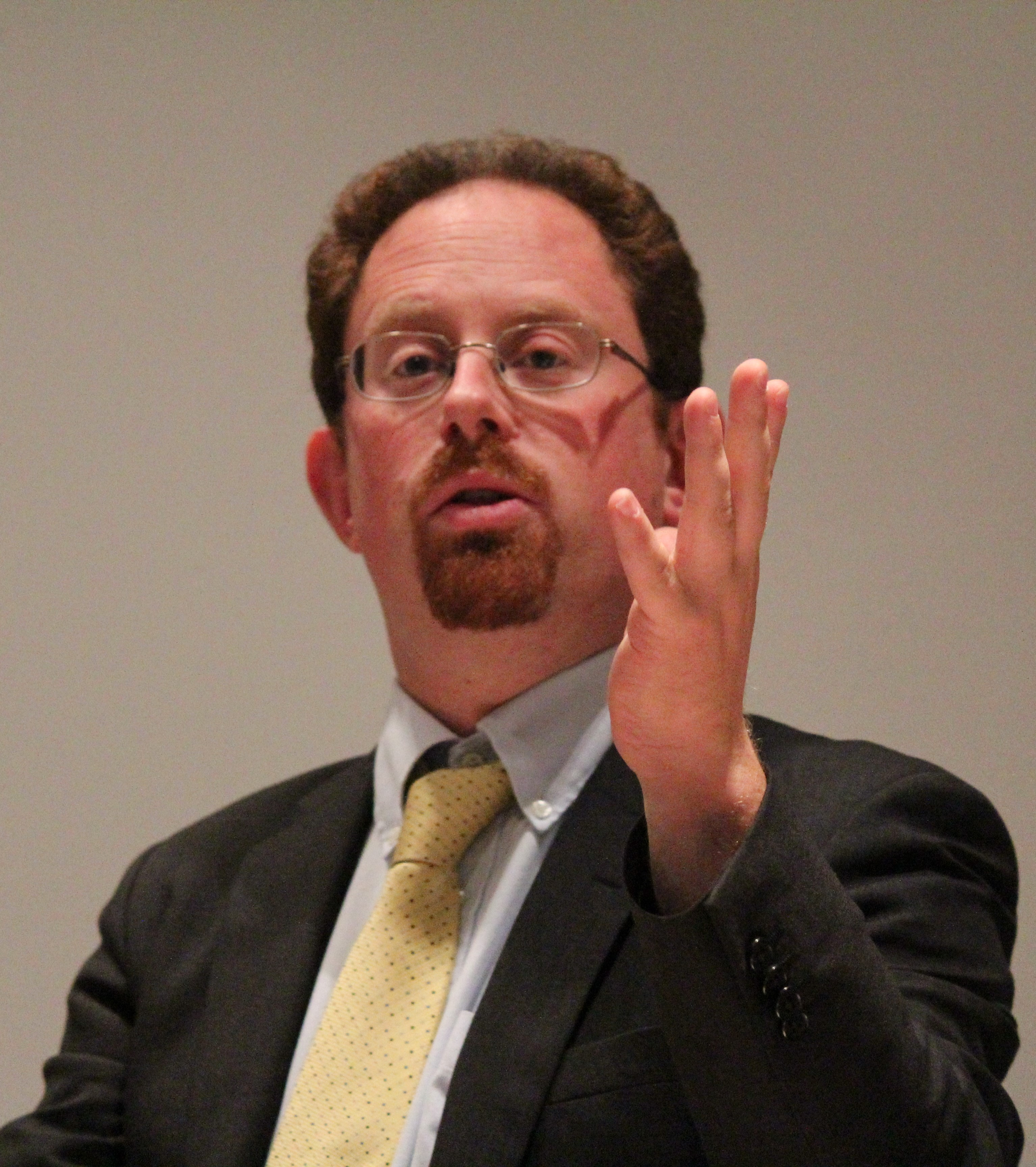

Member of Parliament for Cambridge
- In office 6 May 2010 – 30 March 2015
- Preceded by: David Howarth
- Succeeded by: Daniel Zeichner

Lib Dem Group Leader on Cambridgeshire County Council
- In office October 2004 – May 2007
- Preceded by: Sal Brinton
- Succeeded by: David Jenkins

Cambridgeshire County Councillor for East Chesterton
- In office 3 May 2001 – 4 June 2009
- Preceded by: T O'Del
- Succeeded by: Siep Wijsenbeek

Personal details
- Born: Julian Leon Huppert; 21 July 1978 (age 48)
- Citizenship: United Kingdom, United States
- Party: Liberal Democrats
- Spouse: Dr Caroline Wright
- Parents: Herbert Huppert (father); Felicia Huppert (mother)
- Education: University of Cambridge (MSci, PhD)
- Website: www.jesus.cam.ac.uk/people/julian-huppert
- Scientific career
- Awards: Fellow of the Royal Society of Chemistry
- Thesis: Studies on genomic G-quadruplexes (2005)
- Doctoral advisor: Shankar Balasubramanian

Huppert's voice
from the BBC programme Week in Westminster, 21 December 2013

Julian Leon Huppert (born 21 July 1978) is a British politician who served as Member of Parliament for Cambridge from 2010 to 2015. A member of the Liberal Democrats, he had previously served as a member of the Cambridgeshire County Council for East Chesterton.

Huppert succeeded David Howarth, who stood down after one term as an MP. At the 2015 general election he lost the seat to Daniel Zeichner of the Labour Party by 599 votes, and failed to retake it at the 2017 general election.

== Early life and education ==
Huppert is the son of the Australian-born geophysicist Herbert Huppert and the psychologist Felicia Huppert. He was born in the United States, and moved to Cambridge when he was three months old. He had a Jewish upbringing, and his family attended Beth Shalom Reform Synagogue in Cambridge. However, he has stated that he is an atheist.

After attending the Perse School in Cambridge, Huppert spent a year at Sydney Grammar School in Australia, winning a silver medal at the International Chemistry Olympiad in 1995. At Trinity College, Cambridge, he completed a Master of Science degree in 2000, followed by a PhD in Biological Chemistry in 2005 supervised by Shankar Balasubramanian.

== Career ==
After his PhD, Huppert was elected a Junior Research Fellow of Trinity College in 2004, and became a fellow of Clare College, Cambridge in 2009, where the previous Cambridge Liberal Democrat MP, David Howarth, was a member. He worked as a research scientist studying the structures of DNA as well as tutoring students.

On returning to academic life in 2015, Huppert lectured on science and technology policy at the Cavendish Laboratory, and in 2016 was appointed as the founding director of a new centre, the Intellectual Forum, based at Jesus College.

=== Councillor ===
During his eight years serving as a County Councillor on Cambridgeshire County Council for Cambridge's East Chesterton area, Huppert helped open Brown's Field Community Centre, chaired the Cambridge Traffic Management Committee and served on the Regional Assembly. His interests in internationalism, the UN and human rights led him to a position on the National Council of Liberty, formerly the National Council for Civil Liberties, from 2009 to 2011.

=== Political career ===
Huppert unsuccessfully contested Huntingdon at the 2005 general election, before winning the Cambridge seat in the 2010 general election.

Huppert has stated that he wanted to get involved in politics because he believes in "a free, fair and open society, where nobody should be enslaved by poverty, ignorance or conformity." In an interview with the BBC's Today programme shortly after his election as an MP, Huppert stated, regarding negotiations with the Conservative party on possible deals to form a coalition, that whilst he found it "very hard to see how a deal could leave out electoral reform [...] if we got all the rest of our manifesto I'd probably live with that".

As an MP, Huppert proposed a bill to prevent the demolition or change of use of pubs or independent shops without planning permission under the Ten Minute Rule in 2012 but the proposals failed to make any further progress. In 2013–14 he was an active supporter of and signatory to the Fair Deal For Your Local campaign, which would be the coalition government's only defeat on a legislative vote.

Huppert was involved in a number of All-party parliamentary groups, being joint chair of the Cycling Group, and a vice chair of the All-Party Parliamentary Humanist Group, the Refugees group, and the Local Government group. He also sat on the Home Affairs Select Committee.

Huppert expressed disappointment at the lack of scientific understanding amongst MPs. Although he was described by Cambridge Liberal Democrats and The Independent newspaper as "the only scientist" in the House of Commons, in November 2012, Huppert acknowledged other scientists in the House of Commons saying: "Although it has been said that I am the only scientist in the House, that is sadly not true. I am one of two Members with a science PhD and I went on to do research, but there are other scientists in the House and it always a great pleasure to have them here."

In June 2013 he told the BBC that he complained of bullying in the Commons after being greeted by collective groans and shouts of "Oh no" when he rose to his feet in the house.

When the Liberal Democrat Deputy Leader stepped down to take a ministerial post, Huppert was talked about as a possible contender for the post.

As co-chair of the all party parliamentary cycling group, Huppert helped to produce the report on the future of cycling in Britain, ‘Get Britain Cycling’, in 2013.

Also in 2013, Huppert secured a debate on Education Funding in Cambridgeshire, which resulted in Cambridgeshire schools receiving an extra £23.2 million in government funding, £2.7 million more than originally expected. In 2014, he presented a bill to parliament to improve conditions for those in the private rented sector. Huppert also co-sponsored the International Development (Official Development Assistance Target) Bill, which enshrined in law a commitment by the UK to spend 0.7% of its gross national income (GNI) on aid every year.

=== Cycling ===
Huppert is a cycling safety campaigner and organised and spoke at a parliamentary debate on the subject, as well as passing a motion at the 2013 Liberal Democrat Conference on the subject. His support of the principle of "proportionate liability" has led to debate in his Cambridge Constituency and nationally. Huppert was named one of the most influential people in UK cycling by the magazine Bikebiz and was awarded road safety organisation Brake's Road Safety award in March 2013 for his campaign on 20 mph speed limits.

=== Local campaigns ===
Huppert criticised the decision of the competition commission to force Cineworld to sell the Cambridge Arts Picturehouse. He took up the issue in Parliament, claiming the competition commissions should be looking into other monopolies in Cambridge: "To be frank, I start to wonder what the value of the Competition Commission is. In Cambridge we have two big problems with monopoly – Stagecoach’s control of the buses, and Tesco’s control of the supermarkets." He gained the support of the then leader of the house, Andrew Lansley, who represented the neighbouring constituency of South Cambridgeshire.

In November 2014, Huppert launched a campaign to persuade the County Council to invest more in Cambridge's pavements, highlighting the effect even minor damage has on disabled people.

Huppert also campaigned for additional funding for Cambridge schools, which received less per student than anywhere else in the country.

== Awards and honours ==
Huppert was nominated the most impressive new Liberal Democrat MP elected in the 2010 election by a party website. Huppert's performance has also been highlighted in a number of publications and he was named as the top backbencher in the Telegraph's list of "Most influential Lib Dems".

Huppert was awarded the "Internet Hero of the year award" by the Internet Service Providers Association for his involvement in the campaign against the Draft Communications Data Bill, also known as the "Snooper's Charter".

Huppert was elected a Fellow of the Royal Society of Chemistry.

Parliament of the United Kingdom
Preceded by David Howarth	Member of Parliament for Cambridge; 2010–2015	Succeeded by Daniel Zeichner
