= New Shire Hall =

County building in Alconbury Weald, Cambridgeshire, England

New Shire Hall, Alconbury Weald
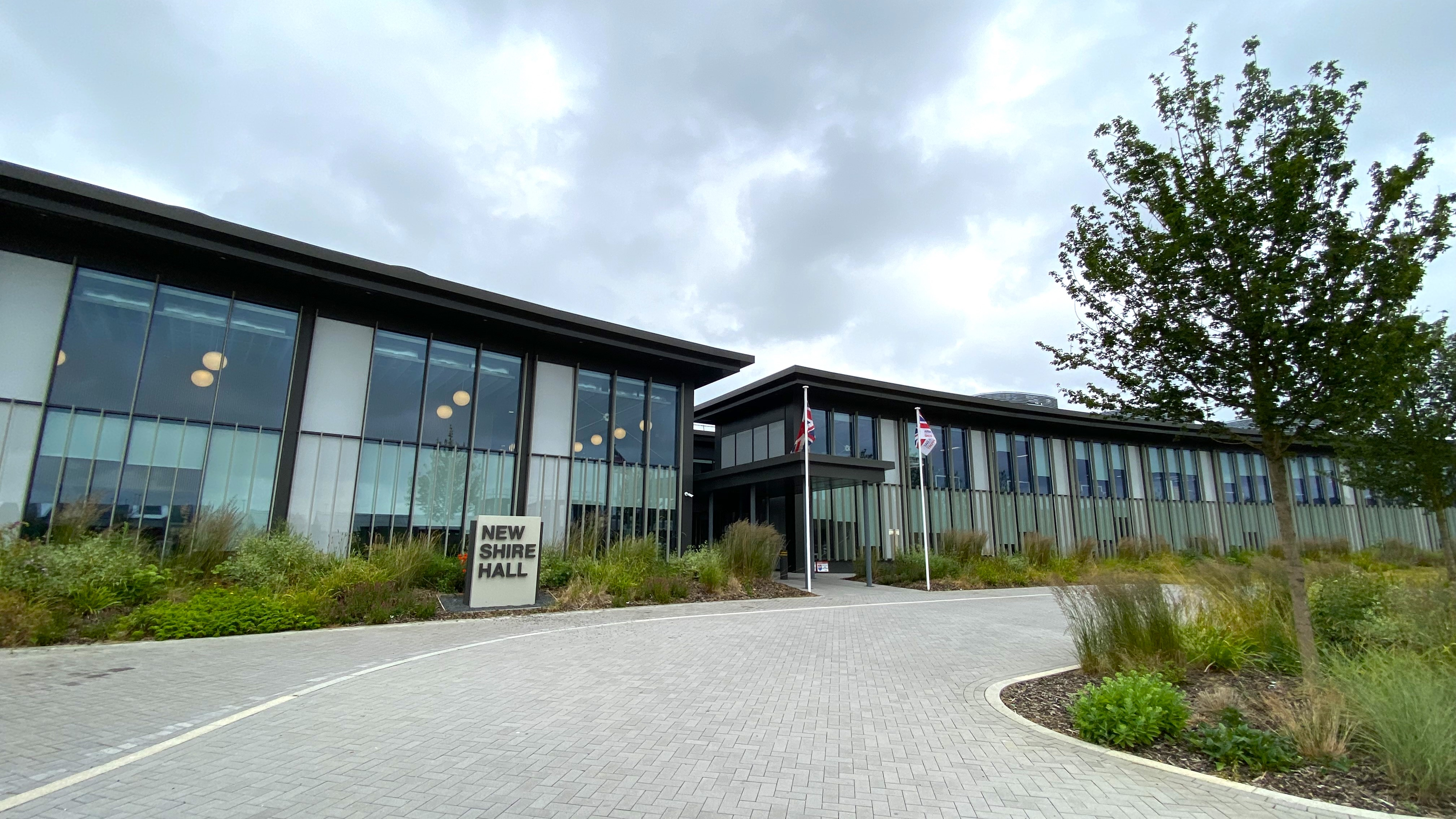
- New Shire Hall in 2023

- Location within Cambridgeshire

General information
- Architectural style: Modern
- Location: New Shire Hall; Emery Crescent; Alconbury Weald; Huntingdon; PE28 4YE, The Stukeleys (parish), United Kingdom
- Coordinates: 52.3761°N 0.2390°W
- Completed: 2020

Design and construction
- Architect: Allford Hall Monaghan Morris

New Shire Hall is a municipal building on Emery Crescent, Alconbury Weald, Cambridgeshire, England, built in 2019–2020. It is the headquarters of Cambridgeshire County Council.

== History ==
Cambridgeshire County Council was created in 1889 and was previously based at various premises in the county town of Cambridge, notably including County Hall, Cambridge from 1914 to 1932 and Shire Hall, Cambridge from 1932 to 2021.

In December 2017, as part of a cost-saving scheme, the county council announced plans to move to a smaller purpose-built facility at Alconbury Weald, a new settlement being developed on the RAF Alconbury site in the civil parish of The Stukeleys, to the north-west of the town of Huntingdon. The site at Alconbury Weald had historically been in the county of Huntingdonshire, which had been absorbed into Cambridgeshire in 1974. The county council's proposed move to Alconbury Weald was approved by the full county council in May 2018.

The county council decided to name the new building at Alconbury Weald "New Shire Hall". It was built by contractors R. G. Carter to plans by the architectural firm of Allford Hall Monaghan Morris, with construction work starting in December 2019. The new building was reported to cost £18.3 million. The final committee meeting to be held at Shire Hall was on 12 March 2020. Meetings were then held online due to the COVID-19 pandemic for the rest of 2020 and first part of 2021, during which time the council vacated Shire Hall and moved to New Shire Hall, with the first committee meeting at New Shire Hall being held in September 2021.

An official opening ceremony was held on 8 July 2022, and the first meeting of the full county council to be held in the building followed later that month.
