= Silvana Cardoso =

Portuguese fluid dynamicist

- Education: University of Porto, University of Cambridge
- Scientific career
- Fields: Fluid mechanics
- Doctoral advisor: Andrew W. Woods
- Other academic advisors: John Davidson, Herbert Huppert, Alírio Rodrigues

Silvana Cardoso is a Portuguese fluid dynamicist working in Britain. She is professor of Fluid Mechanics and the Environment at the University of Cambridge and a fellow of Pembroke College, Cambridge. She leads the Fluids and the Environment research group at the Department of Chemical Engineering and Biotechnology.

Her research focuses on fluid mechanics and environmental science, in particular the interaction of natural convection and chemical kinetics including

- turbulent plumes and thermals in the environment, such as the BP oil disaster in the Gulf of Mexico, the 2010 eruptions of Eyjafjallajökull in Iceland, the Fukushima Daiichi nuclear disaster in Japan and oceanic methane releases.
- flow and reaction in porous media, e.g., the spreading of carbon dioxide in geological storage at Sleipner gas field in the North Sea.
- cool flames and thermo-kinetic explosions, as occurred in the crash of TWA flight 800.
- self-assembling porous precipitate structures, such as chemical gardens and submarine hydrothermal vents.

She is on the International Advisory Panel of the journal Chemical Engineering Science and the Editorial Board of Chemical Engineering Journal.

In 2016 she was awarded the Davidson medal of the Institution of Chemical Engineers (IChemE).

Recent press interest in her work has included pieces on whether natural geochemical reactions can delay or prevent the spreading of carbon dioxide in subsurface aquifers used for carbon capture and storage, the possible melting of oceanic methane hydrate deposits owing to climate change, and the importance to astrobiology of brinicles on Jupiter's moon, Europa.
