= RAF Alconbury =

Royal Air Force station near Huntingdon, Cambridgeshire, United Kingdom

RAF Alconbury USAAF Station 102
- Near Huntingdon, Cambridgeshire in England
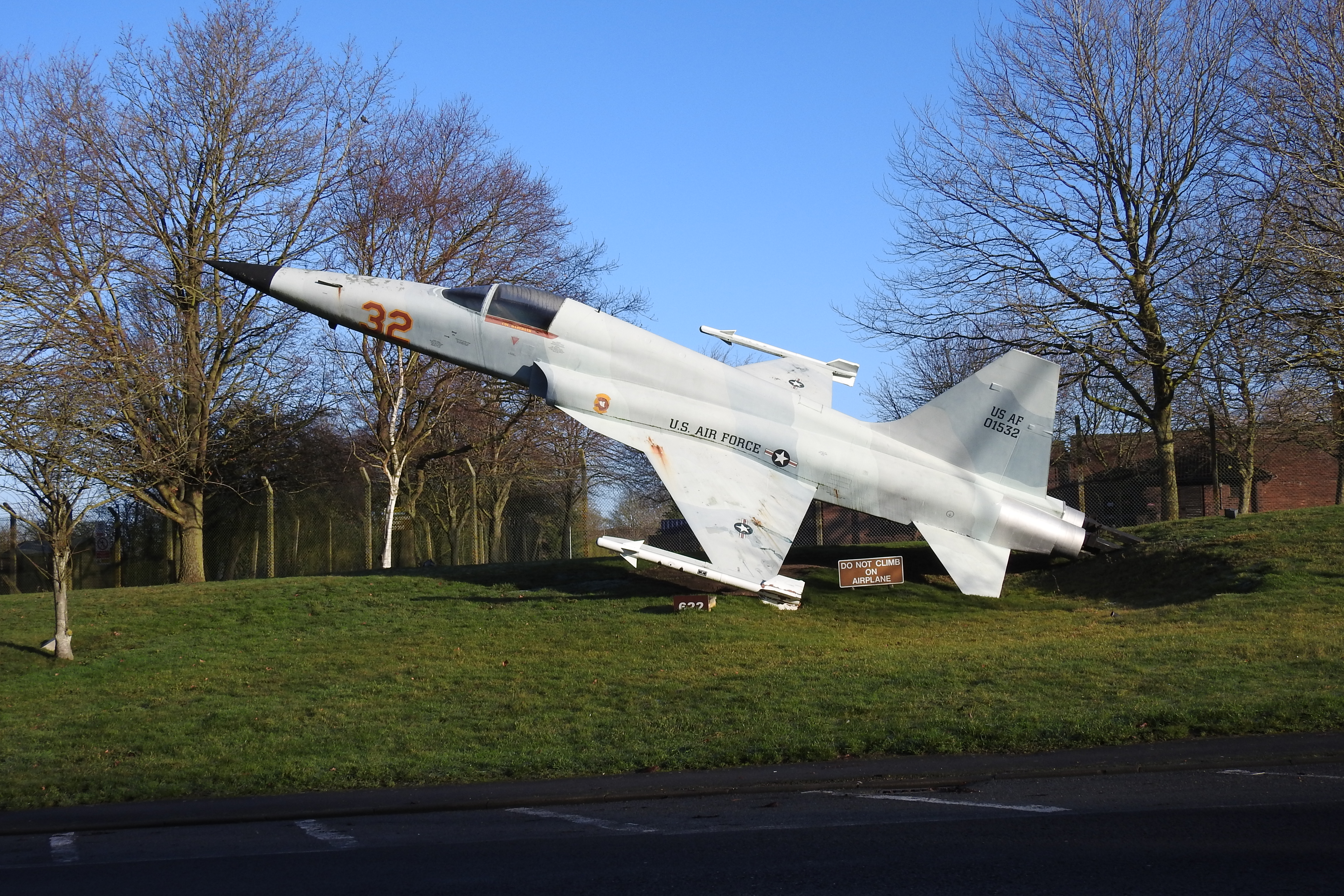
- RAF Alconbury's gate guardian, a full-scale model of a US Air Force F-5E Tiger II, seen during 2020 prior to removal to the former RAF Sculthorpe

Site information
- Type: RAF station (US Visiting Forces)
- Code: AY
- Owner: Ministry of Defence
- Operator: US Air Force
- Controlled by: US Air Forces in Europe – Air Forces Africa previously RAF Bomber Command * No. 2 Group RAF * No. 3 Group RAF
- Condition: Operational

Location
- Shown within Cambridgeshire RAF Alconbury (the United Kingdom)
- Coordinates: 52°21′48″N 000°13′22″W
- Grid reference: TL295795
- Area: 497 hectares (1,230 acres)

Site history
- Built: 1937/38
- In use: May 1938–1942 (Royal Air Force); 1942–1945 (US Army Air Forces); 1951 – present (US Air Force)
- Battles/wars: European theatre of World War II; Cold War

Garrison information
- Occupants: 423d Air Base Group

Airfield information
- Identifiers: IATA: AYH, ICAO: EGWZ, WMO: 035620
- Elevation: 50 metres (164 ft) AMSL
Runways
Direction	Length and surface
12/30	2,500 metres (8,202 ft) Asphalt
06/24 (WWII)	1,750 metres (5,741 ft) Concrete
12/30 (WWII)	1,235 metres (4,052 ft) Concrete
18/36 (WWII)	1,235 metres (4,052 ft) Concrete
- Notes: Flying ceased in 1995

Royal Air Force Alconbury, or more simply RAF Alconbury, is an active Royal Air Force station near Huntingdon, England, that for many years was used by the USAF. The airfield is in the civil parish of The Stukeleys, close to the villages of Great Stukeley, Little Stukeley, and Alconbury. Flying operations no longer occur at the site, with most of the land, including the runway, having been sold in 2009 to become the new settlement of Alconbury Weald.

== History ==
Opened in 1938 for use by RAF Bomber Command, the station was used from 1942 to 1945 by the United States Army Air Forces. It was occupied by the 93rd Bomb Group of the Eighth Air Force; visitors included King George VI, who visited the site and saw the Boeing B-17 Flying Fortresses there on 13 November 1942.

It was announced by The Pentagon on 8 January 2015 that RAF Alconbury and RAF Molesworth would be closing by 2020. Most of the units at Alconbury and Molesworth were to be moved to RAF Croughton in Northamptonshire, along with the personnel. The decision was later reverted on the grounds of cost-effectiveness, with RAF Alconbury remaining as a support base for the Joint Analysis Center.

=== Royal Air Force use ===
- 15 Squadron from 15 April 1940 to 15 May 1940 operating the Bristol Blenheim IV - temporary move from RAF Wyton.
- 40 Squadron from 2 February 1941 to 31 October 1941 operating the Vickers Wellington IC - moved to RAF Luqa, Malta.
- 52 Squadron detachments from RAF Upwood during 1939 with the Fairey Battle and Avro Anson.
- 156 Squadron formed at Alconbury on 14 February 1942 from elements of 40 Squadron with the Vickers Wellington, moved to RAF Warboys in August 1942.
- A Detachment from No. 1 Photographic Reconnaissance Unit RAF (April 1985)
- No. 3 Photographic Reconnaissance Unit RAF (1941)
- No. XV Conversion Flight (January 1942 - May 1942)
- Sub site of No. 264 Maintenance Unit RAF (November 1945 - September 1948)

=== USAAF use ===
- 92nd Bombardment Group (Heavy)
  - 325th Bombardment Squadron
  - 326th Bombardment Squadron
  - 327th Bombardment Squadron
  - 407th Bombardment Squadron
- 93rd Bombardment Group (Heavy)
  - 328th Bombardment Squadron
  - 329th Bombardment Squadron
  - 330th Bombardment Squadron
  - 409th Bombardment Squadron
- 95th Bombardment Group (Heavy)
  - 334th Bombardment Squadron
  - 335th Bombardment Squadron
  - 336th Bombardment Squadron
  - 412th Bombardment Squadron
- 482nd Bombardment Group (Provisional)
  - 812th Bombardment Squadron
  - 813th Bombardment Squadron
  - 814th Bombardment Squadron
- 801st Bombardment Group (Provisional)
  - 36th Bombardment Squadron
  - 406th Bombardment Squadron
  - 788th Bombardment Squadron
  - 850th Bombardment Squadron

=== United States Air Force use ===
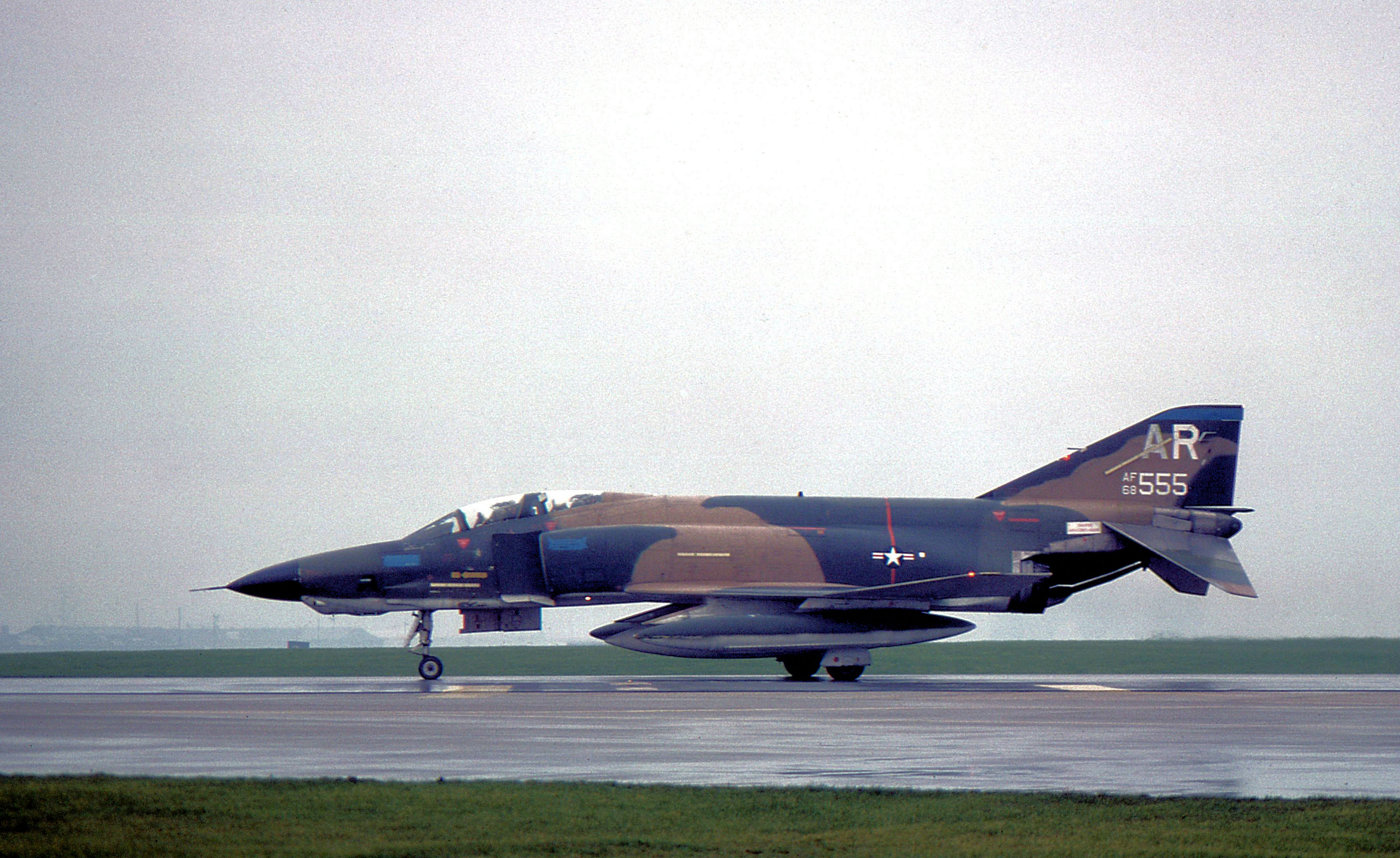
68-0555 10th TRW McDonnell Douglas RF-4C featuring the distinctive base tailcode 'AR', 1980

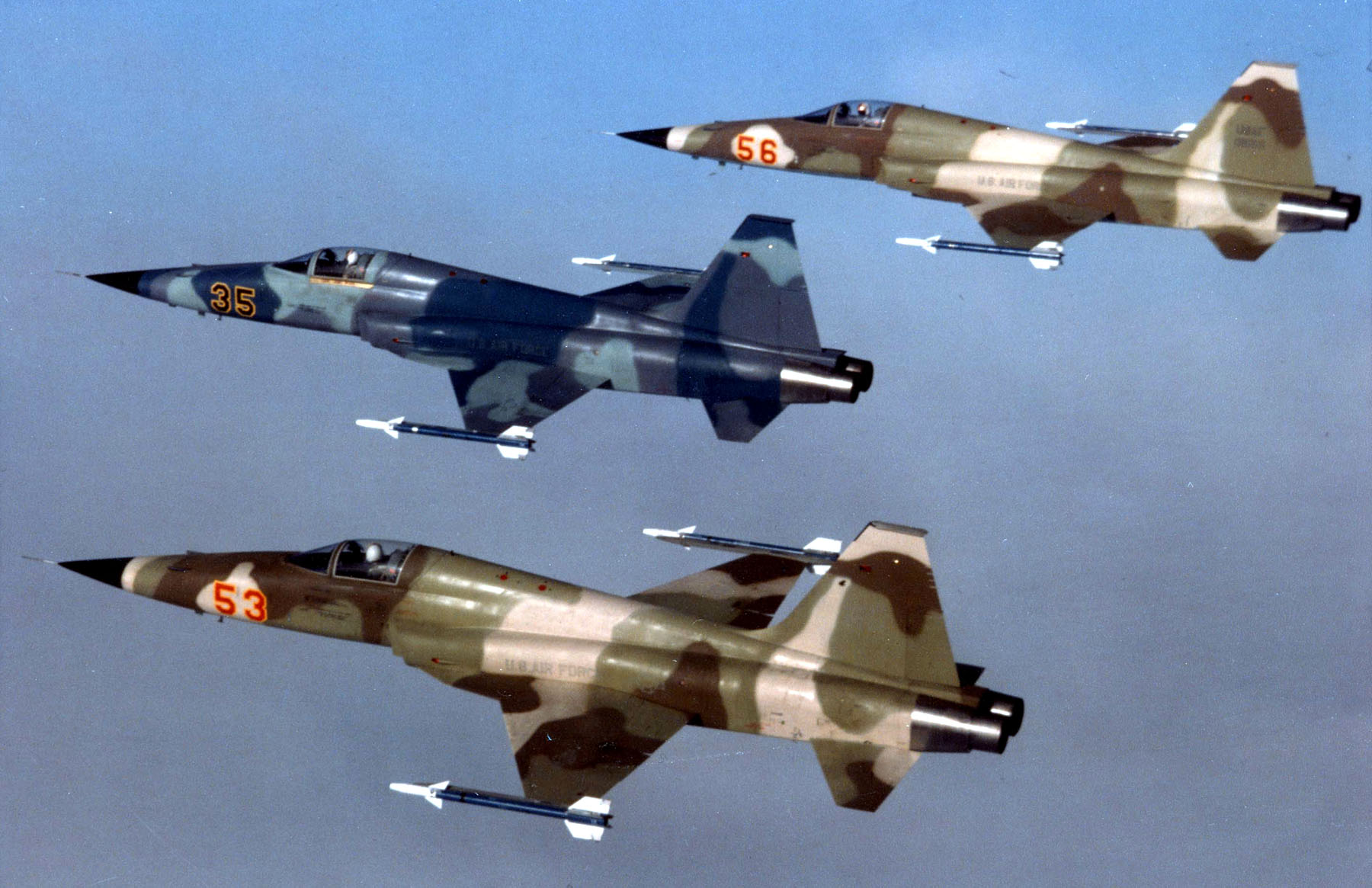
Three F-5E 'Aggressors' from RAF Alconbury, 1983

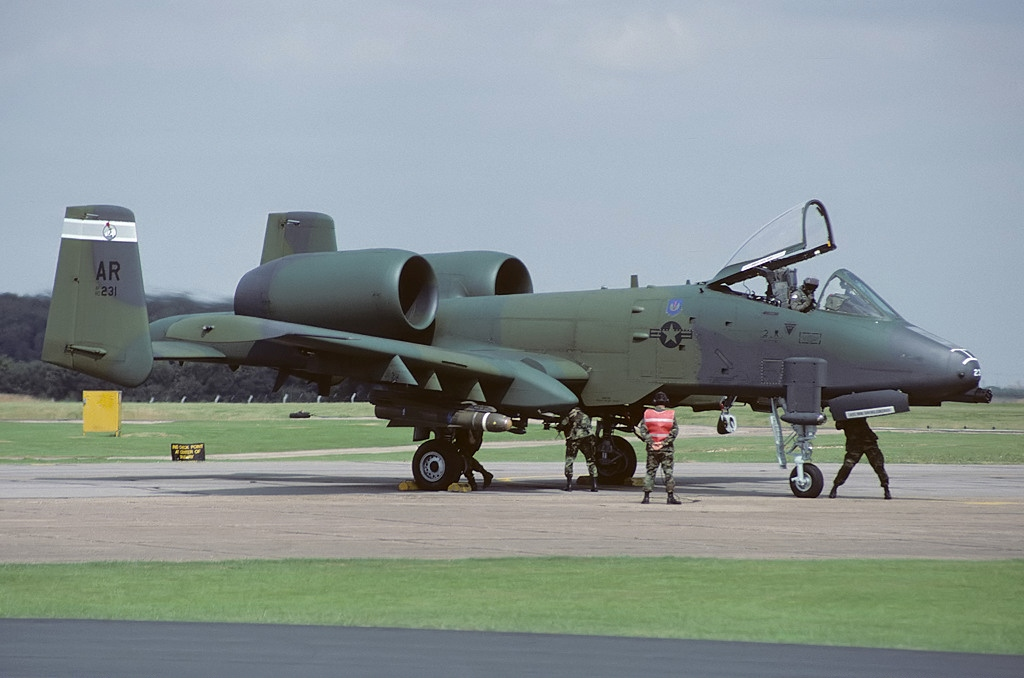
Fairchild A-10A Thunderbolt II, 10th TFW 'AR', August 1988

- 85th Bombardment Squadron (1955–59) (Note: Due to a shortage of space at RAF Sculthorpe, the 85th BS operated from RAF Alconbury as a detachment of the 47th BW.)
  - North American B-45 Tornado
  - Douglas B-66 Destroyer
- 10th Tactical Reconnaissance Wing (1959–87)
  - Douglas RB-66 Destroyer
  - McDonnell Douglas RF-4C
- 527th Tactical Fighter Training Aggressor Squadron (1976–88)
  - Northrop F-5E Tiger II
- 10th Tactical Fighter Wing (1988–94)
  - Fairchild Republic A-10 Thunderbolt II

== Based units ==
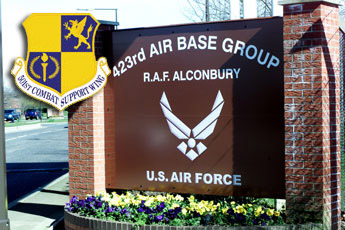
Main entrance of RAF Alconbury

Units based at RAF Alconbury.

United States Air Force

United States Air Forces in Europe - Air Forces Africa (USAFE-AFAFRICA)

- 501st Combat Support Wing
  - Headquarters 501st Combat Support Wing
  - 423rd Air Base Group
    - 423rd Civil Engineer Squadron
    - 423rd Communications Squadron
    - 423rd Force Support Squadron
    - 423rd Medical Squadron
    - 423rd Security Forces Squadron

== See also ==
- List of Royal Air Force stations
- United States Air Force in the United Kingdom
