= David Howarth =

British academic and politician

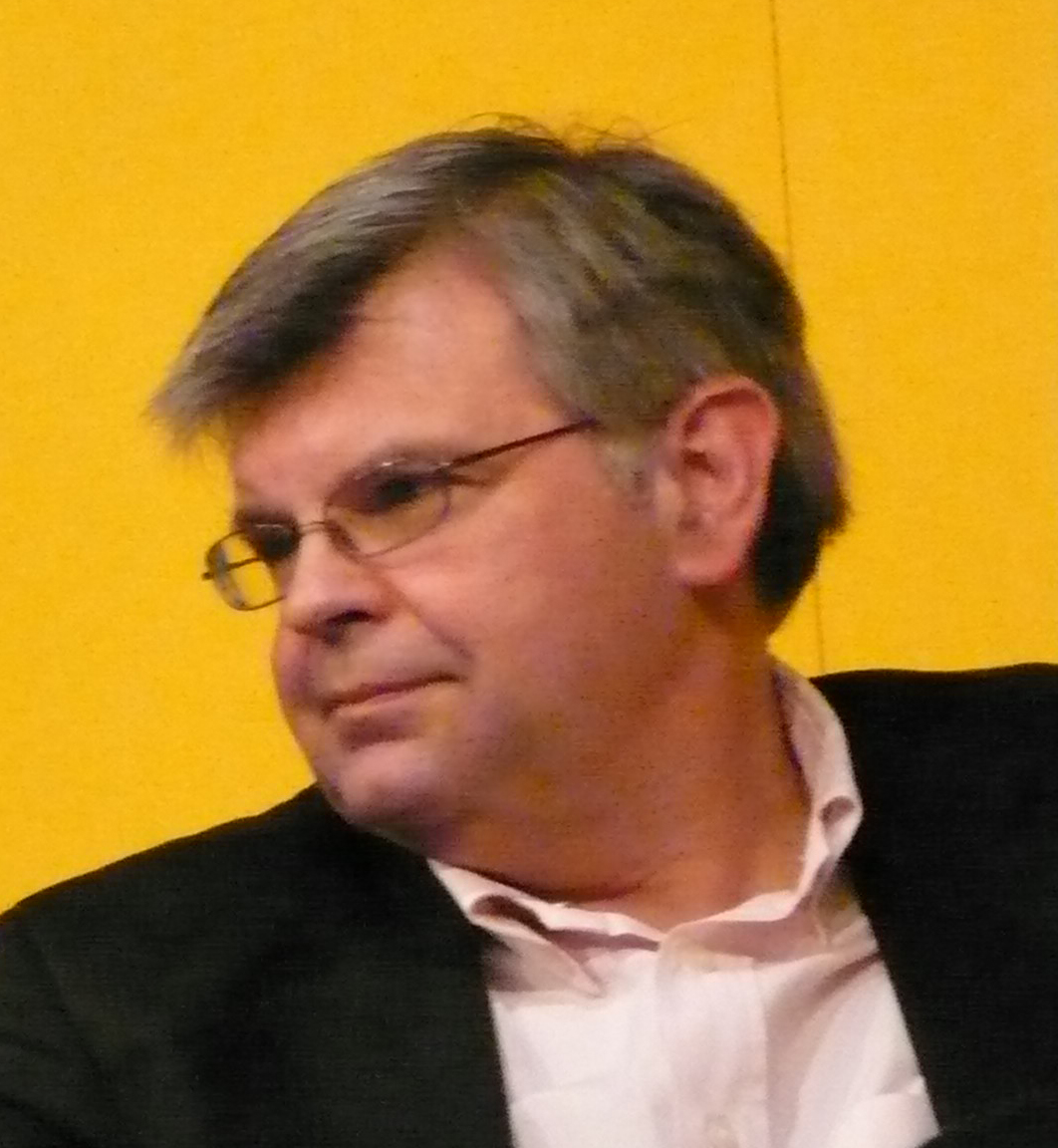

Member of Parliament for Cambridge
- In office 6 May 2005 – 12 April 2010
- Preceded by: Anne Campbell
- Succeeded by: Julian Huppert

Liberal Democrat Shadow Secretary of State for Justice
- In office 18 December 2007 – 6 May 2010
- Leader: Nick Clegg
- Preceded by: Chris Huhne
- Succeeded by: Simon Hughes

Liberal Democrat Shadow Solicitor General
- In office 2 March 2006 – 18 December 2007
- Leader: Menzies Campbell; Vince Cable

Personal details
- Born: David Ross Howarth; 10 November 1958 (age 67) Wednesbury, Staffordshire, England
- Party: Liberal Democrat
- Education: Clare College, Cambridge; Yale Law School
- Website: David Howarth MP

David Ross Howarth (born 10 November 1958) is a British academic and politician who was the Liberal Democrat Member of Parliament for Cambridge from 2005 to 2010. He served as an Electoral Commissioner between 2010 and 2018. He is Professor of Law and Public Policy at the University of Cambridge.

He is the author of Textbook on Tort, Law as Engineering: Thinking about What Lawyers Do and articles in academic journals and chapters in academic books. He researches into a broad range of public and private law areas, conducting empirical research. He has engaged in policy making and leadership in public roles, previously as Leader of Cambridge City Council, and as a member of the Liberal Democrats' Federal Policy Committee.

== Education and academic career ==
David Howarth grew up on the Mossley Estate, a council estate in Bloxwich, Staffordshire, going to Queen Mary's Grammar School, Walsall. Attending Clare College, Cambridge, on an academic scholarship, he obtained a first class degree in Law and won the George Long Jurisprudence prize. He then won a Mellon Fellowship to study at Yale Law School, gaining an LLM, and also obtained an MPhil in Sociology at Yale University. He returned to Cambridge in 1985 to take up a series of academic posts. He has a commitment to teaching as well as research, introducing sociology and economics options to the undergraduate Law programme, and is the founding Director of the MPhil in Public Policy, based in the Department of Politics and International Studies at the University of Cambridge. He has been a fellow of Clare College since 1985, and is now Professor of Law and Public Policy and head of the University's Department of Land Economy.

== Political career ==
Howarth was a Councillor on Cambridge City Council from 1987 to 2004, representing the city's Castle Ward. He was elected Leader of the Liberal Democrat group on Cambridge City Council in 1990 when it was in third place, and then leading it to become the principal opposition on the council, eventually becoming Leader of the Council in 2000. He continued as Leader until 2003, stepping down to concentrate on winning the Cambridge parliamentary seat. He stood unsuccessfully for Parliament in Cambridge in 1992 and 2001, and in the nearby seat of Peterborough in 1997. In the 2005 general election he was elected Member of Parliament for Cambridge, defeating Labour MP Anne Campbell, overturning a majority of 8,579, and winning with a majority of 4,339 votes (securing 44% of the votes cast). He was the first Liberal or Liberal Democrat to win Cambridge since the 1906 general election.

His work as a legislator has informed his research interests, and he has subsequently published on the legislative process (specifically the Backbench Business Committee), conducted empirical research 'The Reality of the Constitution'. Highlights of his legislative scrutiny included work on the Companies Bill; highlighting the problems with the Legislative and Regulatory Reform Bill; the Constitutional Reform and Governance Bill; and various Criminal Justice Bills. Howarth also was successively Shadow Minister for Local Government (2005-6); Shadow Minister for Energy (2006-7); Shadow Solicitor General (2007-9); and Shadow Secretary of State for Justice (2009–10). He served on the Constitutional Affairs, Justice and Environmental Audit Select Committees.

In 2008 Howarth criticised Home Office minister Vernon Coaker's defence of the policing of the Camp for Climate Action at Kingsnorth power station, which was widely criticised as disproportionate, and called on the government and police to end the practice of likening environmental protesters to terrorists.

He was one of the relatively few MPs not implicated in the 2009 expenses scandal, being singled out by The Guardian as one of the "Angels" for having "not claimed a penny in second home allowances" and commuting the 60 miles from Cambridge to Westminster.

On 5 November 2009, he announced that he would be standing down as MP for Cambridge at the next election, citing a desire to return to academia, which he did after the General Election of May 2010. He was subsequently reinstated in his old job, as a Reader in Law and Land Economy at Cambridge University. In 2014, he became a director of the RAND Corporation's European subsidiary.

He served as the Liberal Democrat nominee as an Electoral Commissioner, for two four year terms between October 2010 and October 2018.

== Personal life ==
David Howarth has two children and is married to Edna Howarth. Edna Howarth is a magistrate in Cambridge Magistrates' Court.

Parliament of the United Kingdom
Preceded by Anne Campbell	Member of Parliament for Cambridge; 2005–2010	Succeeded by Julian Huppert
