= Andrew W. Woods =

English mathematician (born 1964)

Andy Woods FRS
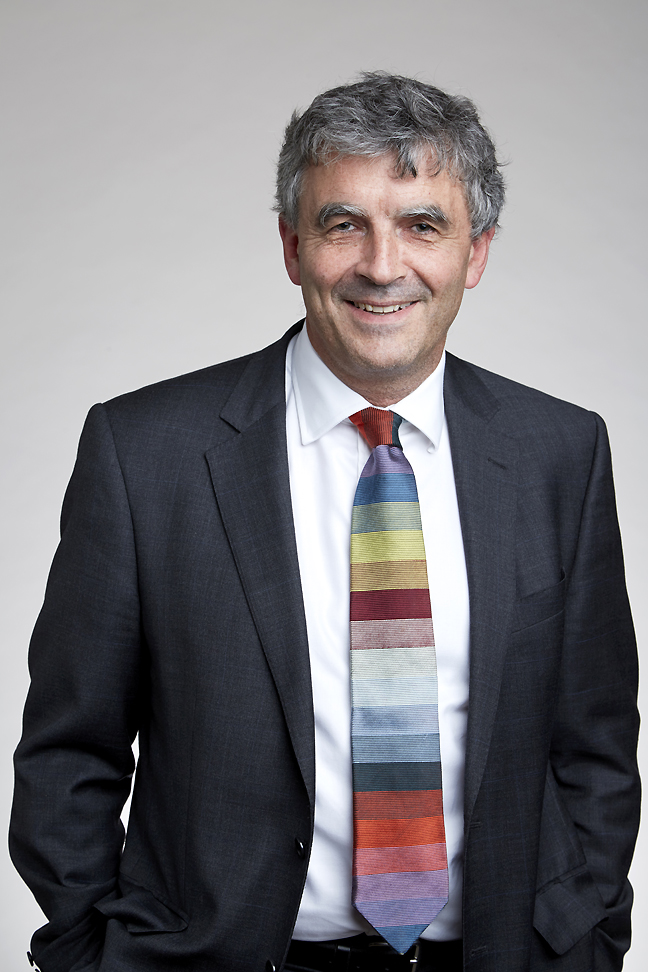
- Woods in 2017
- Born: Andrew William Woods; December 2, 1964 (age 61)
- Education: University of Cambridge
- Awards: Marcello Carapezza Prize; Italgas Prize (1997); Wyss Institute Lecture, Harvard (2011)
- Scientific career
- Workplaces: University of Cambridge; University of Bristol; University of California, San Diego
- Thesis: Geophysical fluid flows (1989)
- Doctoral advisor: Herbert Huppert
- Doctoral students: Silvana Cardoso
- Website: www.bpi.cam.ac.uk/user/andy

Andrew William Woods (born 1964) is an English mathematician who is BP Professor at the University of Cambridge and a professorial fellow of St John's College, Cambridge.

== Education ==
Woods studied the Mathematical Tripos as an undergraduate student of St John's College, Cambridge and completed his PhD in the Department of Applied Mathematics and Theoretical Physics (DAMTP) on geophysical fluid dynamics supervised by Herbert Huppert.

== Career and research ==
Woods spent two years as a research fellow at St John's College and as a Green Scholar at the University of California, San Diego before taking up a lectureship for 5 years at the Institute of Theoretical Geophysics, Cambridge. After three years as professor of applied mathematics at University of Bristol, he was appointed BP Professor and head of the BP Institute, University of Cambridge.

His work is characterised by the development of simplified mathematical and experimental models of complex fluid flow processes covering a wide range of phenomena from the dynamics of explosive volcanic eruptions, to geothermal power generation, carbon sequestration and enhanced oil recovery in heterogeneous porous rocks. His work on the dynamics of mixing in turbulent buoyant plumes and gravity currents has led to new insights about the ascent height of volcanic eruption columns and the run-out distance of pyroclastic flow, as well as constraints on the dynamics of hydrothermal and oil plumes in the deep sea.

He has also developed fundamental understanding of ventilation flows in buildings, developing strategies to minimise heat loss associated with low-energy natural ventilation, as well as exploring the controls on the dispersal of air-borne infection. Other work has included modelling the dynamics of traffic flows, to elucidate controls on the collective behaviour of individual vehicles and strategies to regulate the flow.

=== Awards and honours ===
Woods was elected a Fellow of the Royal Society (FRS) in 2017. He was the Stewartson Lecturer in 1999, the Bullerwell Lecturer in 2000, awarded the Wager Medal in 2002 and the GFD Lecturer in 2003.
