= John W. Miles =

American research professor of applied mechanics and geophysics

- Born: 1 December 1920; Cincinnati, Ohio
- Died: 20 October 2008 (aged 87); Santa Barbara, California
- Education: California Institute of Technology
- Known for: wind-wave growth model
- Awards: Timoshenko Medal of the American Society of Mechanical Engineers (1982); Otto Laporte Award (1983)
- Scientific career
- Fields: Fluid mechanics
- Workplaces: Massachusetts Institute of Technology; Lockheed Aircraft Corporation; UCLA (1945–1961); Scripps Institution of Oceanography, University of California, San Diego (1964–2008)
- Doctoral students: Diane Henderson; Herbert Huppert

John Wilder Miles (December 1, 1920 – October 20, 2008) was a research professor emeritus of applied mechanics and geophysics at Scripps Institution of Oceanography, University of California, San Diego. He was well regarded for his pioneering work in theoretical fluid mechanics, and made fundamental contributions to understanding how wind energy transfers to waves.

== Career ==
The first 20 years of Miles' research was devoted to electrical and aeronautical engineering. He turned his mathematical abilities to geophysical fluid dynamics when he joined Scripps, and made numerous contributions to many aspects of fluid dynamics, including supersonic flow, ocean tides, the stability of currents and water waves and their nonlinear interactions, as well as extensive work in the application of mathematical methods.

Throughout his career, he wrote more than 400 publications. He has the unique distinction of being one of the few fluid mechanics researchers to have published more than hundred scientific research articles (117) in Journal of Fluid Mechanics.

A postdoctoral fellowship has been established in his honor at the Scripps Institution of Oceanography.

== Selected publications ==
- Miles, J. W. (1957), "On the generation of surface waves by shear flows", Journal of Fluid Mechanics, 3 (2): 185–204, Bibcode:1957JFM.....3..185M, doi:10.1017/S0022112057000567, S2CID 119795395
- —— (1963), "On the stability of heterogeneous shear flows. Part 2", Journal of Fluid Mechanics, 16 (2): 209–227, Bibcode:1963JFM....16..209M, doi:10.1017/S0022112063000707, S2CID 122701589
- —— (1974), "Harbor seiching", Annual Review of Fluid Mechanics, 6: 17–33, Bibcode:1974AnRFM...6...17M, doi:10.1146/annurev.fl.06.010174.000313
- —— (1977), "On Hamilton's principle for surface waves", Journal of Fluid Mechanics, 83 (1): 153–158, Bibcode:1977JFM....83..153M, doi:10.1017/S0022112077001104, S2CID 121777750
- —— (1980), "Solitary waves", Annual Review of Fluid Mechanics, 12: 11–43, Bibcode:1980AnRFM..12...11M, doi:10.1146/annurev.fl.12.010180.000303
- ——; Henderson, D. (1990), "Parametrically forced surface waves", Annual Review of Fluid Mechanics, 22: 143–165, Bibcode:1990AnRFM..22..143M, doi:10.1146/annurev.fl.22.010190.001043
