= Robert Ashington Bullen =

Anglican priest

- Born: June 11, 1850; St. George's, Bermuda
- Died: August 14, 1912 (aged 62)
- Education: University of London (BA)
- Occupations: Anglican priest, geologist, authority on mollusca
- Known for: Contributions to geology and malacology
- Spouse: Anna Maria Lloyd
- Children: 1 son, 2 daughters (including Evelyn Margaret Bullen)
- Parent(s): Robert Gaze Bullen, Elizabeth Anne

Reverend Robert Ashington Bullen FLS, FGS, FZS, FRAS (11 June 1850 – 14 August 1912) was an Anglican priest, a geologist and an authority on mollusca.

== Early years ==
R. A. Bullen was born in St. George's in Bermuda, the son of Robert Gaze Bullen, a convict keeper in the Bahamas from 1848 to 1859, and his wife Elizabeth Anne. His siblings Mary Elizabeth Bullen (born 1848) and Arthur Brackenbury Bullen (born 1852) were also born in the Bahamas. The family returned to England when Bullen was aged 6 years. However, Bermuda held a special place in his affections and he returned there later in life and published an account of its geology. Bullen settled with his parents on the south coast and attended a private school in Gosport where his interest in Natural History began. On leaving school it was planned that he should join the Civil Service but a change in his circumstances led him becoming a schoolmaster while at the same time attending the University of London where he took his BA in 1873. Bullen was ordained in 1875 and continued to teach until he became a curate in 1883. He married Anna Maria Lloyd (1853-1918) on 19 December 1885 and they had one son and two daughters.

As a curate Bullen served at St. Peter's church in Croydon (1875-9) and at Farleigh in Surrey (1879–80) before being appointed curate to Archdeacon Frederic Farrar at St. Margaret's church in Westminster until 1888, when he became Vicar of Shoreham in Kent, remaining there until 1896.

== Career and interests ==
It was at Shoreham that he befriended Sir Joseph Prestwich, who persuaded Bullen to carry out a series of researches in locations where fossil land and freshwater mollusca could be found, and in particular those connected with the remains of early Man. These researches he continued until 1911.

In 1896 Bullen became Rector of Little Stukeley in Cambridgeshire (1898-9) and subsequently Rector and Vicar of Wisley and Pyrford in Surrey (1901-5). After resigning the living at Pyrford he made his home first at Hurstpierpoint in Sussex and later at Heathside near Woking. He devoted much time to the work of the various scientific societies to which he had become attached, and in travelling in France, Italy, Spain, and elsewhere leading to his papers on the fossil mollusca of Mallorca, Catalonia and Bermuda, which were of particular interest. The death of his second daughter Evelyn Margaret Bullen in February 1910 affected him deeply and as a result he moved to Hilden Manor, Tonbridge. In 1912 he and his wife made a voyage to Gran Canaria and he was considering a second voyage preparatory to publishing an account of the geology and fossil shells of those islands at the time of his death.

== Academic societies ==
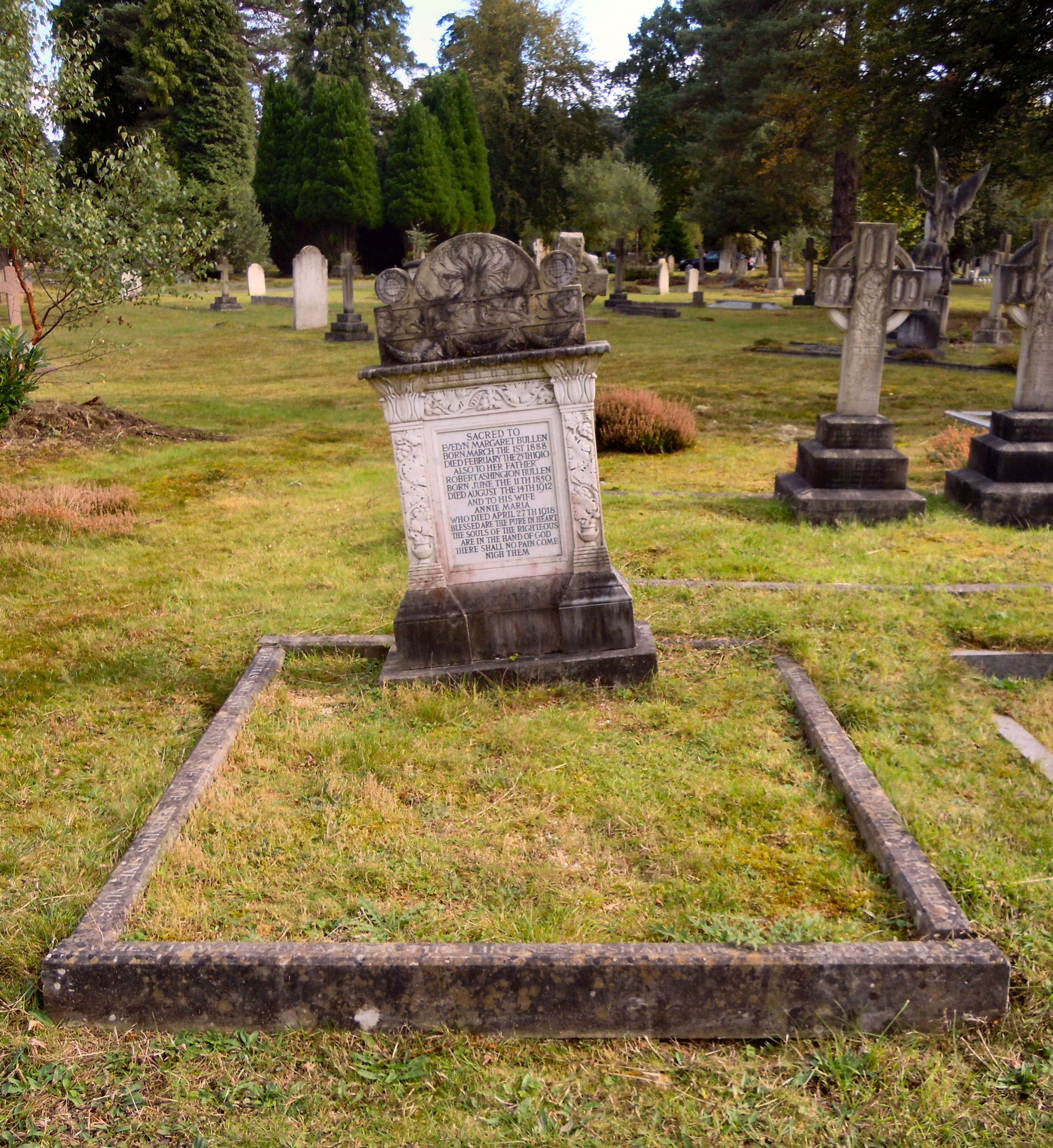
Bullen's grave in Brookwood Cemetery

Bullen joined the Geological Society in 1891, the Geologists' Association in 1893, the Malacological Society of London in 1897, the Linnean Society of London in 1899, and the Zoological Society of London in 1911. He was a Fellow of the Royal Astronomical Society and a member of the Selborne Society and the South-Eastern Union of Scientific Societies.

He is buried in Brookwood Cemetery near Woking with his wife Anna Maria (died 1918) and his daughter Evelyn Margaret Bullen (1888-1910). A memorial plaque dedicated to him is in the church of St Peter and St Paul in Shoreham where he was the priest from 1888 to 1896.
