= Diane Henderson =

American mathematician

Diane Marie Henderson is an American applied mathematician, specializing in fluid dynamics and mathematical oceanography. Unusually for a mathematics professor, some of her research involves physical experiments with wave tanks, high speed cameras, and oil droplets.

Henderson earned her Ph.D. in physical oceanography from the University of California, San Diego in 1990. Her dissertation, Faraday Waves, was supervised by John W. Miles. She is a professor of mathematics at Pennsylvania State University and one of two faculty members leading the William G. Pritchard Fluid Mechanics Laboratory at Pennsylvania State University.

Henderson is a 1992 Packard Foundation Fellow. She was awarded a Sloan Research Fellowship in 1996.
