= Anne Campbell (politician) =

British Labour politician

Member of Parliament for Cambridge
- In office 9 April 1992 – 11 April 2005
- Preceded by: Robert Rhodes James
- Succeeded by: David Howarth

Personal details
- Born: 6 April 1940 (age 86)
- Party: Labour
- Education: Newnham College, Cambridge
- Profession: Teacher

Anne Campbell (born 6 April 1940) is an English Labour Party politician. She was the member of parliament (MP) for Cambridge from 1992 to 2005.

== Early life ==
She studied at Newnham College, Cambridge, taking the Maths Tripos, and gaining an MA in 1965.

Before she became an MP she was a councillor on Cambridgeshire County Council from 1985 to 1989. She was a secondary school mathematics teacher in Cambridgeshire, a lecturer in statistics at Cambridge College of Arts and Technology (became Anglia Higher Education College in 1989) from 1970 to 1983, and head of Statistics and Data Processing at the National Institute of Agricultural Botany from 1983 to 1992.

== Parliamentary career ==
She was first elected in the 1992 general election. Under threat of deselection, in 2003 she resigned as Patricia Hewitt's PPS to vote against the Iraq War, having previously voted to support the Government's policy on 26 February. She lost her seat at the 2005 general election to David Howarth of the Liberal Democrats. Campbell's defeat was in part attributed to her perceived indecisiveness over the government's university top-up fee programme: she abstained on the second reading of the bill, then voted with the government on the third reading, despite a public promise that she would oppose the scheme. Campbell was described as a "loyal Blairite" in the national press.

In 2008, Campbell was portrayed by Harriet Walter in 10 Days to War, a BBC television dramatisation of the events leading up to the Iraq war.

== Subsequent career ==
Campbell is (2014) Chair of Governors at Parkside Federation Academy and a governor at UTC University Technical College Cambridge. She became chair of the Fabian Society for 2008.

== Awards ==
In 1997, Campbell became an Honorary Doctor of Philosophy at Anglia Ruskin University.

== Personal life ==
Campbell was often seen riding her bike around the Cambridge constituency and was the first MP to run a website. In 1963 she married Archibald Campbell, a Cambridge University engineering professor and Fellow of Christ's College, who died on 21 November 2019. They had a son and two daughters.

Parliament of the United Kingdom
| Preceded by Robert Rhodes James | Member of Parliament for Cambridge; 1992–2005 | Succeeded by David Howarth |
Party political offices
| Preceded by Ed Balls | Chair of the Fabian Society; 2007–2008 | Succeeded by Sadiq Khan |
