= Alconbury Weald =

Coordinates: 52.37°N 00.24°W

- Location within Cambridgeshire
- Population: 1,221
- OS grid reference: TL2076
- Civil parish: The Stukeleys
- District: Huntingdonshire
- Shire county: Cambridgeshire
- Region: East
- Country: England
- Sovereign state: United Kingdom
- Post town: Huntingdon
- Postcode district: PE28
- Dialling code: 01480
- Police: Cambridgeshire
- Fire: Cambridgeshire
- Ambulance: East of England
- UK Parliament: Huntingdon

Alconbury Weald is a new settlement in the civil parish of The Stukeleys, in the Huntingdonshire district, of the county of Cambridgeshire, England. The settlement lies to the north-west of the town of Huntingdon, and to the south of Peterborough. The site was previously part of RAF Alconbury, with planning permission for the first phase of the new settlement being granted in 2014. It is close to the A1(M) motorway. Cambridgeshire County Council moved its headquarters from Cambridge to New Shire Hall at Alconbury Weald in 2021.

== History ==
The Royal Air Force station at Alconbury opened in 1938, and was subsequently also used from 1942 by the United States Army Air Force, with operations continuing at the base after the Second World War had ended. By 2009 flying operations from the base had ceased, although the American air force continued to use part of the site. Most of the redundant land at RAF Alconbury, including the former runway, was sold to a development company, Urban and Civic, in 2009 for £27.5 million.

The old airfield had straddled the civil parishes of Alconbury (after which it was named) and The Stukeleys, with many of the buildings on the site closely adjoining the village of Little Stukeley. The parish boundaries were redrawn in April 2010 to put the whole of the site into the parish of The Stukeleys.

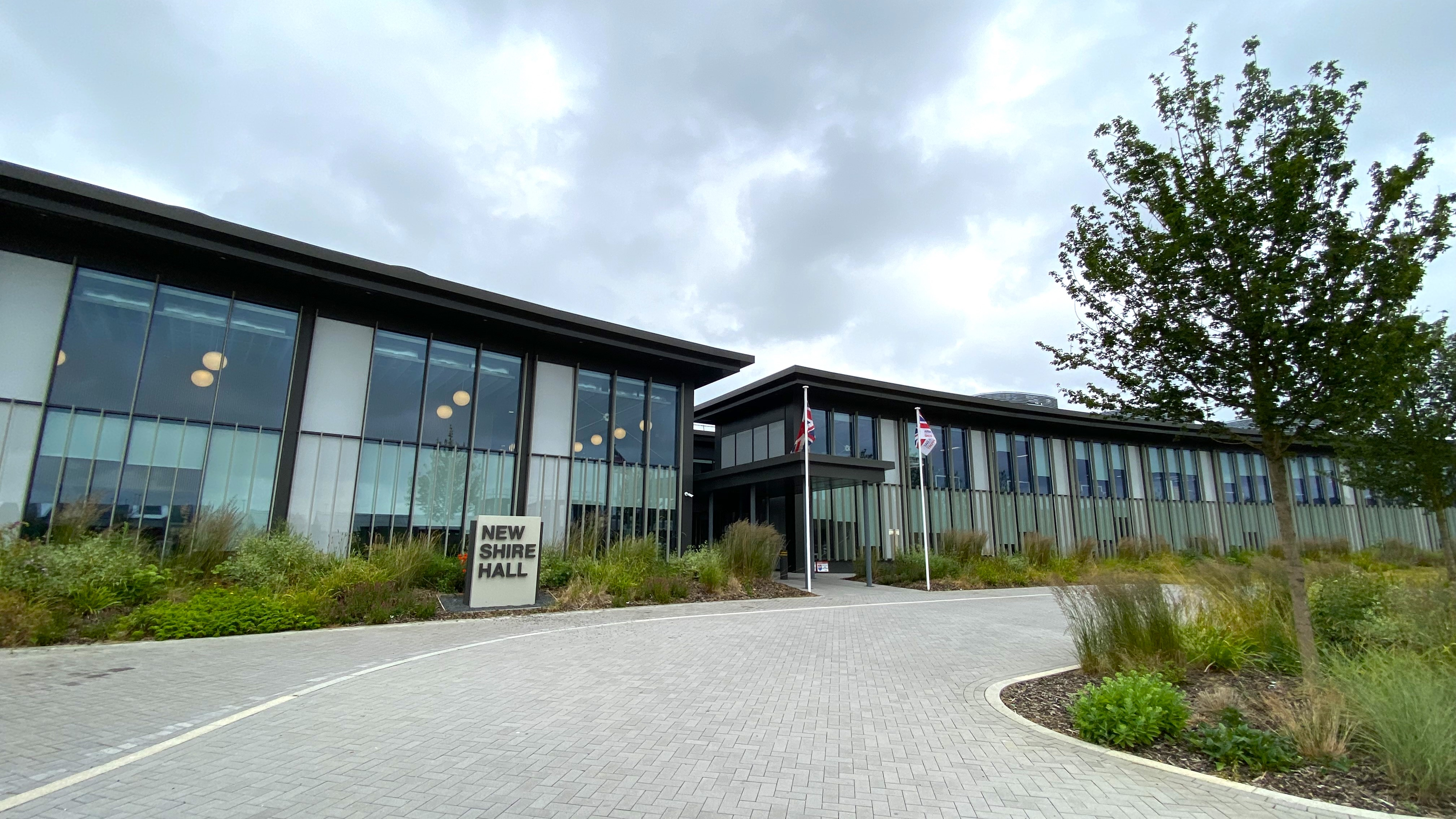
New Shire Hall: headquarters of Cambridgeshire County Council at Alconbury Weald (pictured June 2023)

In 2011, the UK Government designated the Alconbury Enterprise Zone covering the site, to encourage development delivering new jobs and homes in the area.

Planning permission was granted in October 2014 for up to 290,000 m^{2} of employment floorspace and up to 5,000 homes, with supporting infrastructure and facilities, including shops, schools, health and leisure facilities and open spaces. The application also reserved a site for a possible new railway station on the Great Northern Railway, which skirts the eastern edge of the site. Residents began occupying the first new homes on the site in 2016, with the first school on the site opening in September 2016.

In 2018, Cambridgeshire County Council decided to vacate its former headquarters at Shire Hall, Cambridge and move to a new building at Alconbury Weald. The new building was named "New Shire Hall", with the council's first committee meeting there being held in September 2021.

In the 2021 Census, Alconbury Weald had a population of 1,221.
