= Herbert Huppert =

British geophysicist (born 1943)

Professor Herbert Huppert FRS FRSN
- Born: 26 November 1943 (age 82); Sydney, Australia
- Education: Sydney University; University of California, San Diego
- Spouse: Felicia Adina Ferster (m. 1966; div. 2016)
- Children: 2, including Julian Huppert
- Awards: Royal Society Bakerian Medal (2011); Arthur L. Day Prize and Lectureship (2005); Murchison Medal (2007); Royal Medal (2020); Scientist of the Year in Earth Sciences (2020); Global Australian Award (2024)
- Scientific career
- Fields: Geophysics
- Workplaces: University of Cambridge; King’s College, Cambridge; University of New South Wales
- Thesis: The Excitation of Lee Waves in Stratified Flow by Semi-elliptical Obstacles (1968)
- Doctoral advisor: John W. Miles
- Doctoral students: Andy Woods
- Website: www.itg.cam.ac.uk/people/heh/

Herbert Eric Huppert (born 26 November 1943) is an Australian-born and educated geophysicist resident in Cambridge, United Kingdom. He was Professor of Theoretical Geophysics and Foundation Director, Institute of Theoretical Geophysics, at the University of Cambridge, from 1989 to 2011, and a Fellow of King's College, Cambridge, from 1970 to 2025.

== Education and early life ==
Huppert was born in Sydney and he received his early education at Sydney Boys High School (1956–59). He graduated in applied mathematics from Sydney University with first class Honours, a University medal and the Barker Travelling Fellowship in 1964. He then completed a PhD supervised by John W. Miles at the University of California, San Diego, and came as an ICI Post-doctoral Fellow to DAMTP in Cambridge in 1968.

== Career and research ==
He has published using fluid-mechanical principles in applications to the Earth sciences: in meteorology, oceanography and geology. He was a member of the Editorial Board of the Journal of Fluid Mechanics (1970–1992), the Philosophical Transactions of the Royal Society (series A) (1994–99), The Proceedings of the Royal Society (series A) (2015-2020) and Geomechanics and Geophysics for Geo-energy and Georesources (2014 — ) and has been on the Council of the Royal Society (2001–03). He was Chairman of a Royal Society Working Group on bioterrorism, which produced a Report entitled 'Making the UK Safer', on 21 April 2004. He was also chair of the European Academies Science Advisory Committee (EASAC) Working Group that produced a report for the European Parliament and President on carbon capture and storage. He was awarded the 2011 Bakerian lecture for his research into geological fluid dynamics. Since 1990 he has held a part-time Professorship at the University of New South Wales in Sydney, Australia.

=== Awards and honours ===
Huppert was elected a Fellow of the Royal Society (FRS) in 1987. In 2005 he was the only non-American recipient of a prize from the United States National Academy of Sciences, being awarded the Arthur L. Day Prize and Lectureship for contributions to the Earth sciences. He has been elected a Fellow of the American Geophysical Union, the American Physical Society and the Academia Europaea.. In 2020 he was awarded a Royal Medal and named Scientist of the Year in Earth Science. In 2024 he was elected to the Prof. N. R. Kamath chair professorship at IIT Bombay, Mumbai and was the recipient of a Global Australian Award (Sustainability & Climate Change). In 2025 he was appointed to a Westlake University (China) Distinguished Fellowship.

== Personal life ==
In 1966, Huppert married Felicia (née Ferster); she was an Emerita Professor of Psychology and a past fellow of Darwin College, Cambridge. They divorced in 2016. His sons, Julian and Rowan, studied at the University of Cambridge. Julian Huppert was the Liberal Democrat Member of Parliament for Cambridge from 2010 to 2015 and is now the Foundation Director of the Intellectual Forum of Jesus College, Cambridge.

== Controversies ==
In 2025 Kings College stripped him of his fellowship due to sexual harassment allegations.

== Bibliography ==
- Debrett's People of Today
- Jewish Year Book, 2005
- 'Making the UK safer' report on bioterrorism
- 'Lecture July 2011 – Carbon storage: caught between a rock and climate change, Professor Herbert Huppert FRS
