= Great Stukeley =

Village in Cambridgeshire, England

Coordinates: 52.35°N 0.21°W

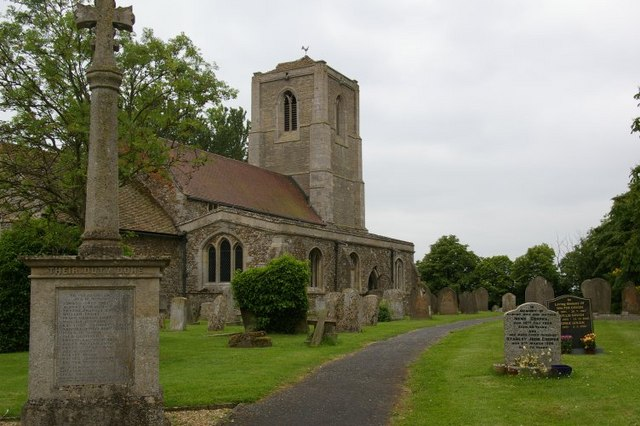

- Location within Cambridgeshire
- Population: 1,340 (2011 Census including Little Stukeley)
- OS grid reference: TL2197074650
- Civil parish: The Stukeleys
- District: Huntingdonshire
- Shire county: Cambridgeshire
- Region: East
- Country: England
- Sovereign state: United Kingdom
- Post town: Huntingdon
- Postcode district: PE28
- Dialling code: 01480

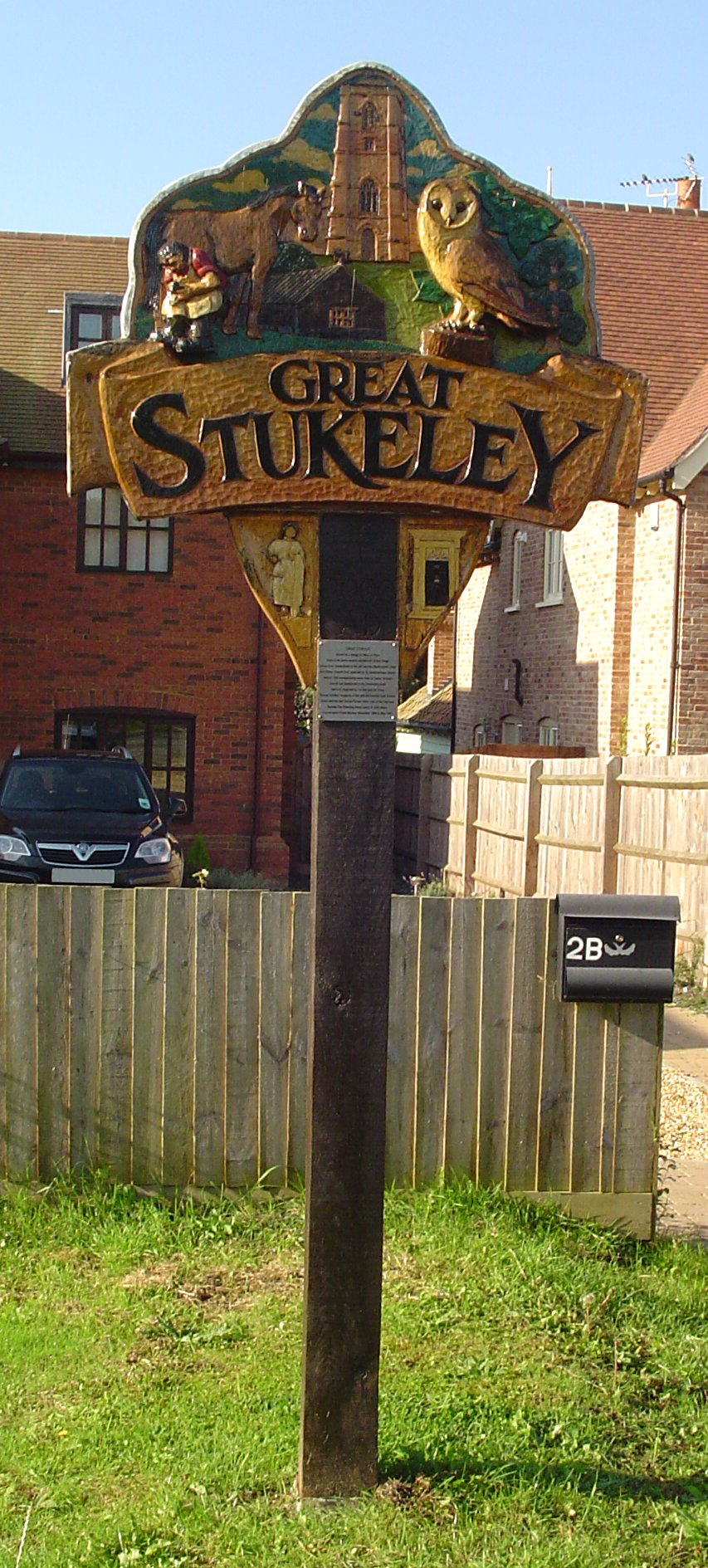
Signpost in Great Stukeley

Great Stukeley is a village and former civil parish, now in the parish of The Stukeleys in Cambridgeshire, England. It is 1.8 miles (2.9 km) north-west of Huntingdon. Great Stukeley is in Huntingdonshire which is a non-metropolitan district of Cambridgeshire as well as a historic county of England. It lies on the old Roman road of Ermine Street. In 1931 the parish had a population of 354.

The East Coast Main Line railway runs near to Great Stukeley and serves the nearby Huntingdon railway station. The church in Great Stukeley is dedicated to Saint Bartholomew and the village war memorial is contained within its grounds.

== History ==
Great Stukeley was listed in the Domesday Book of 1086 in the Hundred of Hurstingstone in Huntingdonshire; the name of the settlement was written as Stivecle in the Domesday Book. In 1086 there were two manors at Great Stukeley; the annual rent paid to the lords of the manors in 1066 had been £12 and the rent was the same in 1086.

The Domesday Book does not explicitly detail the population of a place but it records that there were 27 households at Great Stukeley. There is no consensus about the average size of a household at that time; estimates range from 3.5 to 5.0 people per household. Using these figures then an estimate of the population of Great Stukeley in 1086 is that it was within the range of 94 and 135 people.

The Domesday Book uses a number of units of measure for areas of land that are now unfamiliar terms, such as hides and ploughlands. In different parts of the country, these were terms for the area of land that a team of eight oxen could plough in a single season and are equivalent to 120 acres (49 hectares); this was the amount of land that was considered to be sufficient to support a single family. By 1086, the hide had become a unit of tax assessment rather than an actual land area; a hide was the amount of land that could be assessed as £1 for tax purposes. The survey records that there were eight ploughlands at Great Stukeley in 1086 and that there was the capacity for a further eight ploughlands. In addition to the arable land, there was 26 acres (11 hectares) of meadows and 720 acres (291 hectares) of woodland at Great Stukeley.

The tax assessment in the Domesday Book was known as geld or danegeld and was a type of land-tax based on the hide or ploughland. It was originally a way of collecting a tribute to pay off the Danes when they attacked England, and was only levied when necessary. Following the Norman Conquest, the geld was used to raise money for the King and to pay for continental wars; by 1130, the geld was being collected annually. Having determined the value of a manor's land and other assets, a tax of so many shillings and pence per pound of value would be levied on the land holder. While this was typically two shillings in the pound the amount did vary; for example, in 1084 it was as high as six shillings in the pound. For the manors at Great Stukeley the total tax assessed was 3.3 geld.

By 1086 there was already a church and a priest at Great Stukeley.

'In 1870–72, John Marius Wilson's Imperial Gazetteer of England and Wales described Great Stukeley like this:

STUKELEY (Great), a parish, with a scattered village, in the district and county of Huntingdon; 2 miles NNW of Huntingdon r. station. It contains the county jail, and has a post-office under Huntingdon. Acres, 2,990. Real property, £3,872. Pop. in 1861, 453,-of whom 36 were in the jail. Houses, 87. The manor belongs to L. Torkington, Esq. The living is a vicarage in the diocese of Ely. Value, £124.* Patron, Trinity Hall, Cambridge. The church has a massive tower of the 14th century, and is good. There are a national school, and charities £16.'

== Governance ==
Great Stukeley and Little Stukeley are in the civil parish of The Stukeleys which has its own elected parish council that is responsible for providing and maintaining a variety of local services including the allotments, street lighting, play areas, grass cutting and tree planting. It helps to maintain and extend the paths in the built area and the countryside, provides the bus shelter, litter, dog-waste and salt bins. A committee of the parish council reviews all planning applications and makes recommendations to Huntingdonshire District Council, which is the planning authority for the parish. The parish council also represents the views of the parish on issues such as local transport, policing and the environment. The parish council raises its own tax to pay for these services, known as the parish precept, which is collected as part of the Council Tax. In 2015, The Stukeleys parish council had nine members; meetings were held on the first Monday of a month either in Great Stukeley Village Hall or in Little Stukeley Village Hall. On 1 April 1935 the parish of Great Stukeley was abolished to form "The Stukeleys", part also went to Huntingdon.

Great Stukeley was in the historic and administrative county of Huntingdonshire until 1965. From 1965, the village was part of a new administrative county of Huntingdon and Peterborough. In 1974, following the Local Government Act 1972, Great Stukeley became a part of Cambridgeshire.

The second tier of local government is Huntingdonshire District Council which is a non-metropolitan district of Cambridgeshire and has its headquarters in Huntingdon. Huntingdonshire District Council has 52 councillors representing 29 district wards. Huntingdonshire District Council collects the council tax, and provides services such as building regulations, local planning, environmental health, leisure and tourism. Great Stukeley is a part of the district ward of Alconbury and The Stukeleys and is represented on the district council by one councillor. District councillors serve for four-year terms following elections to Huntingdonshire District Council.

For Great Stukeley the highest tier of local government is Cambridgeshire County Council which has administration buildings in Cambridge. The county council provides county-wide services such as major road infrastructure, fire and rescue, education, social services, libraries and heritage services. Cambridgeshire County Council consists of 69 councillors representing 60 electoral divisions. Great Stukeley is part of the electoral division of Huntingdon and is represented on the county council by two councillors.

At Westminster Great Stukeley is in the parliamentary constituency of Huntingdon, and elects one Member of Parliament (MP) by the first past the post system of election. Great Stukeley is represented in the House of Commons by Ben Obese-Jecty (Conservative), who has represented the constituency since 2024. The village was previously represented by former Prime Minister, Sir John Major (Conservative), who represented the constituency between 1983 and 2001.

== Geography ==
Great Stukeley is situated on the old Roman road of Ermine Street on a small hill to the north-west of Huntingdon.

The village lies on a bedrock of blue-grey Oxford clay formed around 160 million years in the Jurassic period, together with alluvium (clay and silt) from the same period. The surface soil is characterised as Oadby Member Diamicton, formed within the last two million years during Ice Age conditions by glaciers scouring the land.

The village, which is approximately 42 metres (138 ft) above sea level, lies just to the north of the A14 road that runs from the Port of Felixstowe to the Catthorpe Interchange, Leicestershire.

=== Climate ===
The climate in the United Kingdom is defined as a temperate oceanic climate, or Cfb on the Köppen climate classification system, a classification it shares with most of northwest Europe. Eastern areas of the United Kingdom, such as East Anglia, are drier, cooler, less windy and also experience the greatest daily and seasonal temperature variations. Protected from the cool onshore coastal breezes further to the east of the region, Cambridgeshire is warm in summer, and cold and frosty in winter.

The nearest Met Office climate station to Great Stukeley is at Monks Wood near Alconbury, which is 3.4 miles (5.5 km) to the north. The average annual rainfall for the United Kingdom between 1981 and 2010 was 1,154 millimetres (45.4 in) but Cambridgeshire is one of the driest counties with around half of the national level. Regional weather forecasting and historical summaries are available from the UK Met Office. Additional local weather stations report periodic figures to the internet such as Weather Underground, Inc.

Climate data for Monks Wood, elevation 41m, (1981–2010 averages)
Month	Jan	Feb	Mar	Apr	May	Jun	Jul	Aug	Sep	Oct	Nov	Dec	Year
Mean daily maximum °C (°F)	7.2 (45.0)	7.7 (45.9)	10.7 (51.3)	13.5 (56.3)	16.8 (62.2)	19.7 (67.5)	22.4 (72.3)	22.3 (72.1)	19.2 (66.6)	15.0 (59.0)	10.3 (50.5)	7.4 (45.3)	14.4 (57.9)
Mean daily minimum °C (°F)	1.1 (34.0)	0.8 (33.4)	2.6 (36.7)	3.8 (38.8)	6.6 (43.9)	9.7 (49.5)	11.8 (53.2)	11.7 (53.1)	9.9 (49.8)	7.0 (44.6)	3.9 (39.0)	1.9 (35.4)	5.9 (42.6)
Average rainfall mm (inches)	47.0 (1.85)	35.0 (1.38)	40.1 (1.58)	47.0 (1.85)	47.9 (1.89)	54.1 (2.13)	48.3 (1.90)	51.7 (2.04)	53.3 (2.10)	60.2 (2.37)	54.2 (2.13)	47.1 (1.85)	585.8 (23.06)
Mean monthly sunshine hours	58.0	77.4	109.9	152.3	186.2	180.6	193.3	188.1	142.5	114.6	67.0	52.4	1,522.2
Source: Met Office Monks Wood, Cambridgeshire

== Demography ==
=== Population ===
In the period 1801 to 1901 the population of Great Stukeley was recorded every ten years by the UK census. During this time the population was in the range of 304 (the lowest was in 1811) and 482 (the highest was in 1851).

From 1901, a census was taken every ten years with the exception of 1941 (due to the Second World War).

Parish	1911	1921	1931	1951	1961	1971	1981	1991	2001	2011
Great Stukeley	352	373	354							
Little Stukeley	240	228	209							
The Stukeleys	592	601	563	612	2,909	2,529	2,387	931	2,052	1,340

All population census figures from report Historic Census figures Cambridgeshire to 2011 by Cambridgeshire Insight.

Great Stukeley and Little Stukeley were combined into a single parish at some time between 1931 and 1951.

In 2011, the parish covered an area of 4,552 acres (1,842 hectares) and so the population density for The Stukeleys in 2011 was 188.4 persons per square mile (72.7 per square kilometre).

== Transport ==
Great Stukeley has two bus stops on opposite sides of Ermine Street. The north bus stop provides services in the direction of Peterborough and the south bus stop provides services to Huntingdon, St Ives and further afield. By taking the bus into Huntingdon it is possible to ride on the Cambridgeshire Guided Busway to St Ives and into Cambridge.

== Culture and community ==
Great Stukeley has several amenities although the village shop and post office closed many years ago. There are two public houses in the village: The Stukeleys Country Hotel and The Three Horseshoes. There is a large recreational field with children's play equipment on the eastern side of Ermine Street. Great Stukeley village hall is situated at the entrance to Owl End, and it hosts many functions each month, including Tumble Tots and Weight Watchers.

Other active societies and clubs include the Stukeleys Heritage Group, the Women's Institute (WI) and Great Stukeley Table Tennis Club.

The Alconbury Weald development is taking place near Great Stukeley.

== Religious sites ==
A church in Great Stukeley is mentioned specifically in the Domesday Survey of 1086 but this original church did not survive. The oldest part of the current building is the north arcade, built in c.1250. The church was modified throughout the 14th and 15th centuries and the construction of the tower commenced in 1470.

Great Stukeley is also home to a chapel of the Church of Jesus Christ of Latter-day Saints.

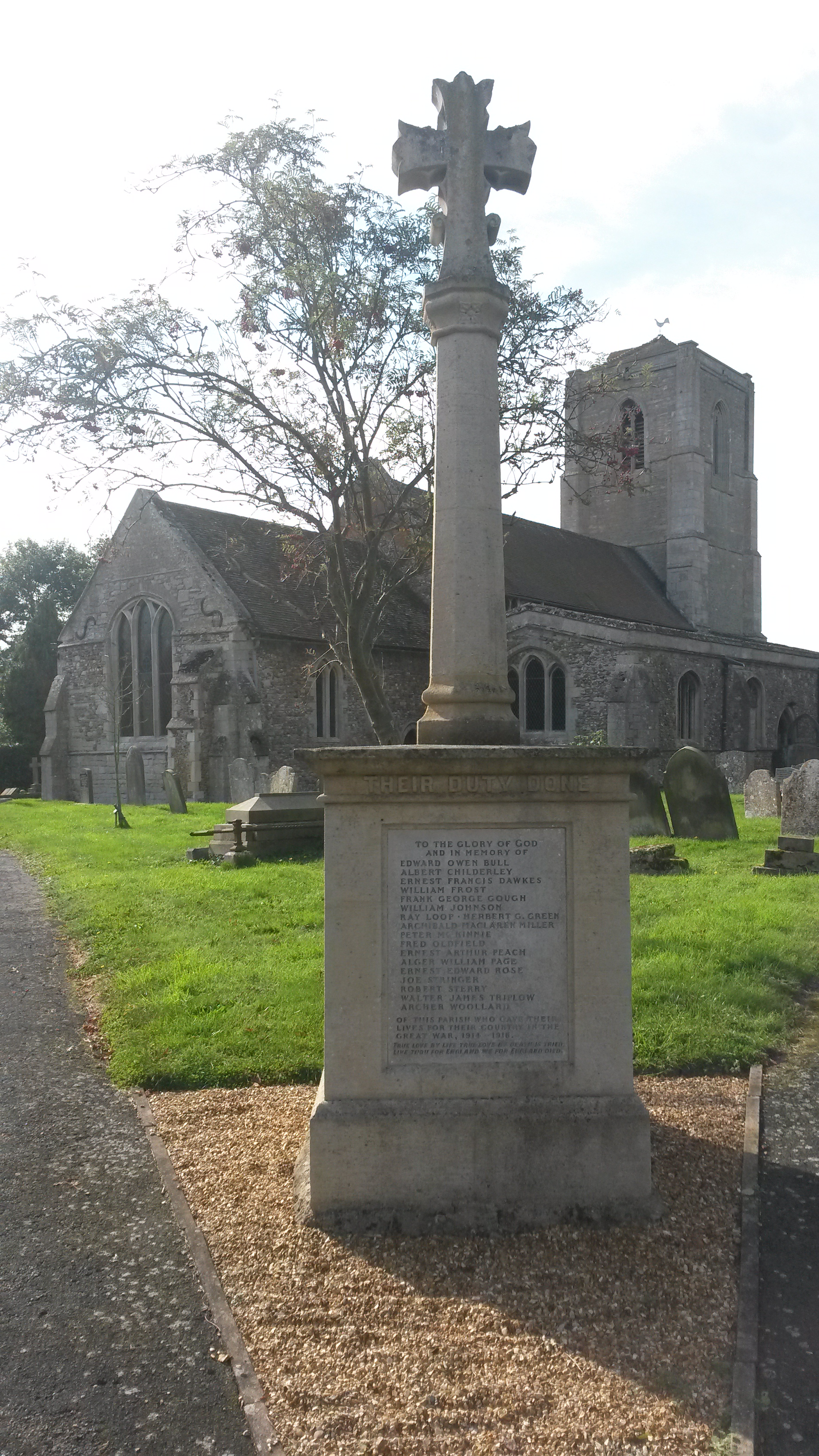
Great Stukeley war memorial

== Public services ==
Anglian Water supplies the village water and sewage services from their Huntingdon North Public Water Supply zone (FW40). The water quality was reported as excellent in 2015. In the same report, the hardness was reported as 306 mg/L of calcium carbonate, which indicates that the water here is in the very hard range. The nearest reservoir, Grafham Water, is 5.3 miles (8.5 km) south-west of the village.

Huntingdonshire District Council is part of the Recycling in Cambridgeshire and Peterborough (RECAP) Partnership, which was granted Beacon status for waste and recycling in 2006–07. In 2014–15, the council was just short of its target of recycling or composting 55% of all local household waste.

National Health Services (NHS) for the village are administered by NHS East of England. The nearest hospital is Hinchingbrooke, which is 1.6 miles (2.6 km) south from Great Stukeley and has a range of specialities, including Accident and Emergency. Further afield, there is Addenbrooke's Hospital, 19.5 miles (31.4 km) south-east and Papworth Hospital 8 miles (13 km) south-east of the village. The nearest General Practice doctor's surgery is in Huntingdon.

The Cambridgeshire and Peterborough Fire Authority is responsible for providing fire and rescue services to a region that includes Great Stukeley. Its headquarters are in Brampton; the nearest 24-hour fire station is at Huntingdon.

Cambridgeshire Constabulary is responsible for law enforcement within Cambridgeshire. The nearest police station to Great Stukeley is at Huntingdon.

== Notable people ==
- Former British prime minister John Major lives at Finings with his wife Norma.
