= The Stukeleys =

Civil parish in Cambridgeshire, England

- Location within Cambridgeshire
- Population: 2,696 (2021)
- OS grid reference: TL214758
- District: Huntingdonshire
- Shire county: Cambridgeshire
- Region: East
- Country: England
- Sovereign state: United Kingdom
- Post town: Huntingdon
- Postcode district: PE28
- Police: Cambridgeshire
- Fire: Cambridgeshire
- Ambulance: East of England
- UK Parliament: North West Cambridgeshire

The Stukeleys is a civil parish in the district of Huntingdonshire, in Cambridgeshire, England, consisting of the villages of Great Stukeley and Little Stukeley, and the new settlement of Alconbury Weald being built on the old RAF Alconbury site. The parish lies just north-west of Huntingdon. As well as the two villages, the parish also includes Huntingdon racecourse.

== Geography ==
The East Coast Main Line runs across the eastern edge of the parish.

The A14 road, until 2022, ran south-east to north-west across the western half of the parish and the dual-carriageway has junction with the A1 road just outside the western border of the parish, although the Alconbury grade-separated intersection was built in December 1964, by A. Monk Ltd. The 6.5 miles Huntingdon - Godmanchester bypass was also built by A. Monk Ltd, of Padgate for £6m from on Monday 4 June 1973, to finish in the summer of 1975. The dual-carriageway bypass opened as the A604 on Tuesday 30 September 1975, for Huntingdonshire County Council.

Cambridgeshire County Council has its headquarters at New Shire Hall on the Alconbury Weald development in the parish.

== Government ==
The Stukeleys has its own elected parish council that is responsible for providing and maintaining a variety of local services including the allotments, street lighting, play areas, grass cutting and tree planting. It helps to maintain and extend the paths in the built area and the countryside, provides the bus shelter, litter, dog-waste and salt bins. A committee of the parish council reviews all planning applications and makes recommendations to Huntingdonshire District Council, which is the planning authority for the parish. The parish council also represents the views of the parish on issues such as local transport, policing and the environment. The parish council raises its own tax to pay for these services, known as the parish precept, which is collected as part of the Council Tax. In 2015, The Stukeleys parish council had nine members; meetings were held on the first Monday of a month either in Great Stukeley Village Hall or in Little Stukeley Village Hall

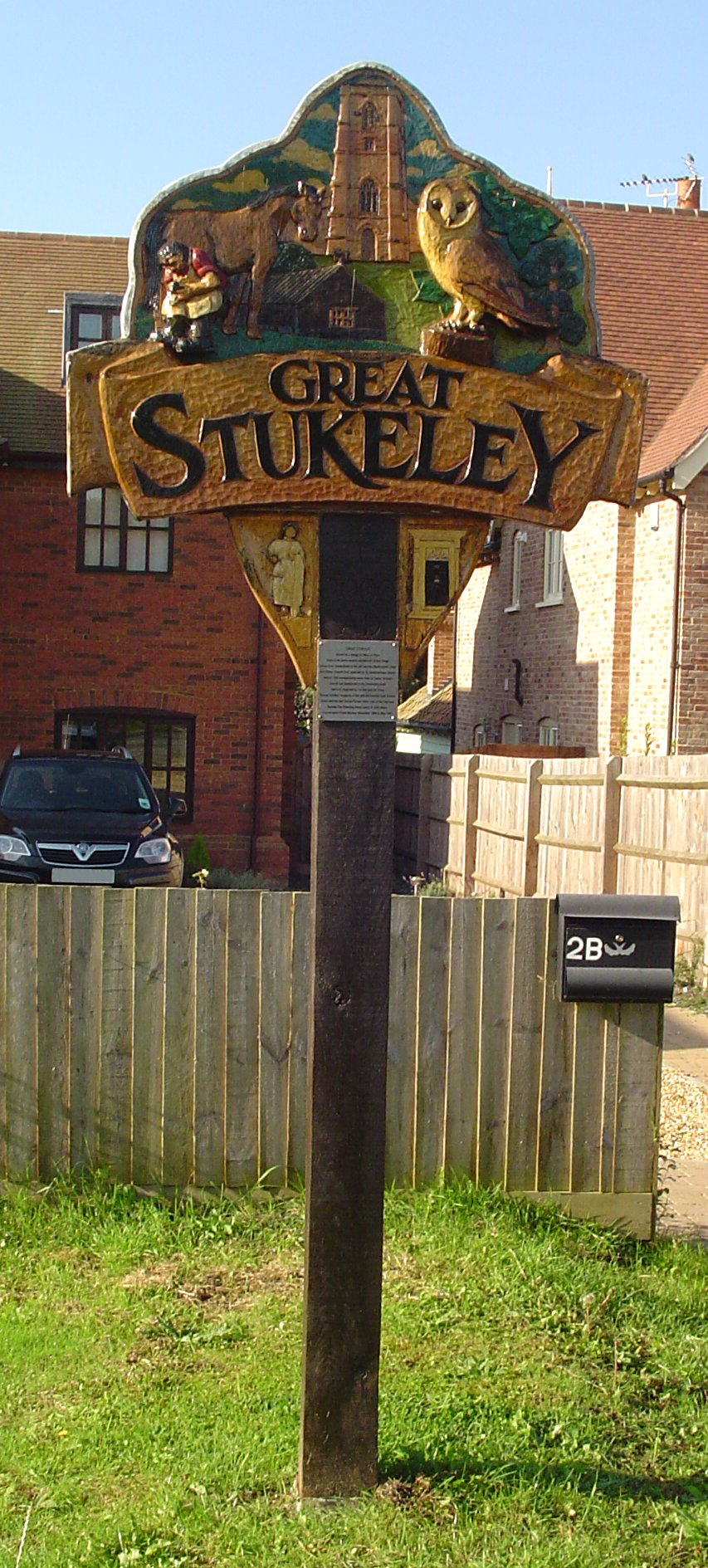
Signpost in Great Stukeley

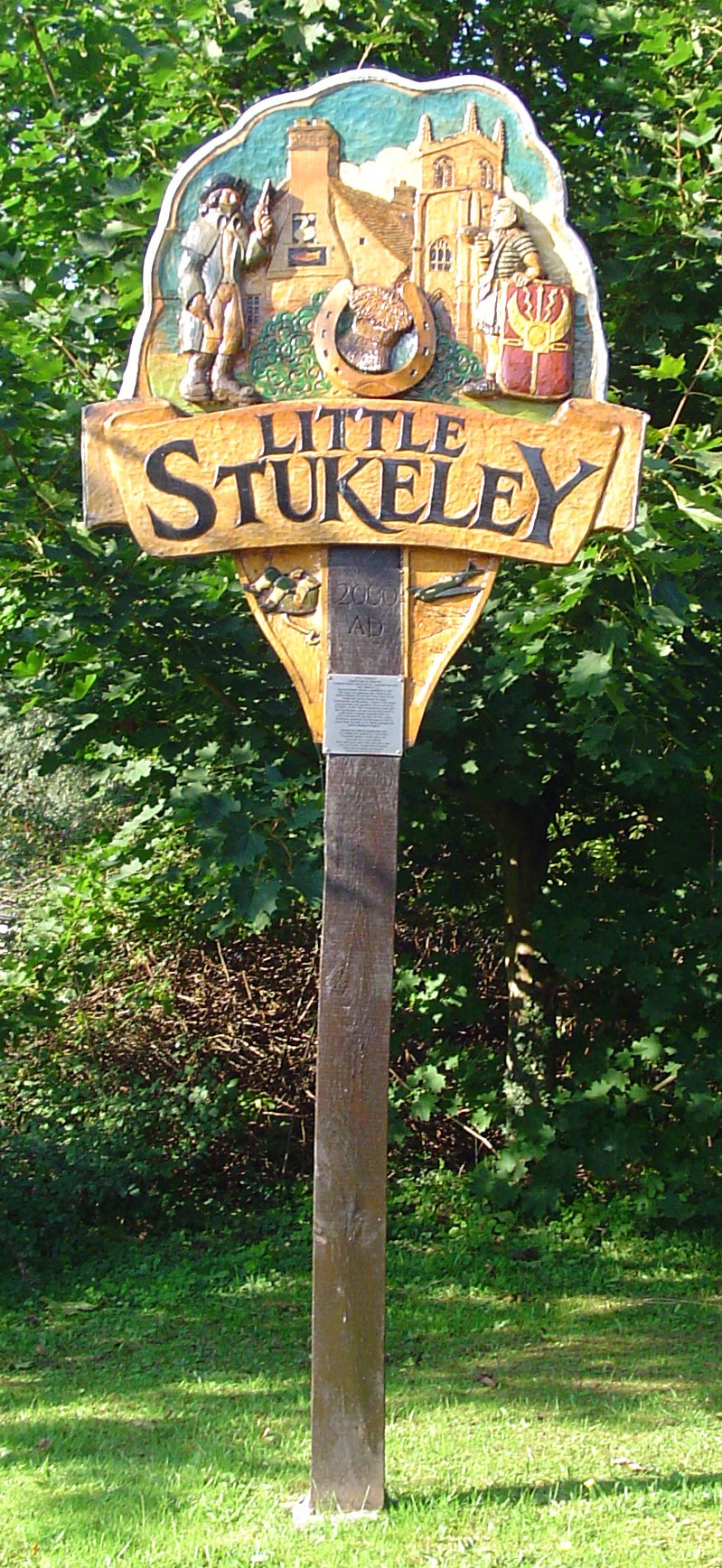
Signpost in Little Stukeley

== Demography ==
=== Population ===
Parish	1911	1921	1931	1951	1961	1971	1981	1991	2001	2011	2021
Great Stukeley	352	373	354								
Little Stukeley	240	228	209								
The Stukeleys	592	601	563	612	2,909	2,529	2,387	931	2,052	1,340	2,696

All population census figures from report Historic Census figures Cambridgeshire to 2011 by Cambridgeshire Insight.

The parish of The Stukeleys was created on 1 April 1935 from the merger of the two former parishes of Great Stukeley and Little Stukeley.

In 2011, the parish covered an area of 4,552 acres (1,842 hectares) and so the population density for The Stukeleys in 2011 was 188.4 persons per square mile (72.7 per square kilometre).

== Energy generation ==
A solar farm was built towards the village of Abbots Ripton, just inside the parish boundary at 52.375°N 0.200°W. It covers an area of 150 acres (61 hectares), contains over one hundred thousand photovoltaic solar panels and is one of the larger solar farms in England. It started power generation in March 2014 and has a peak capacity of 24.7MWp; enough to power over 7,000 households.
