= Little Stukeley =

Village in Cambridgeshire, England

Coordinates: 52.37°N 0.226°W

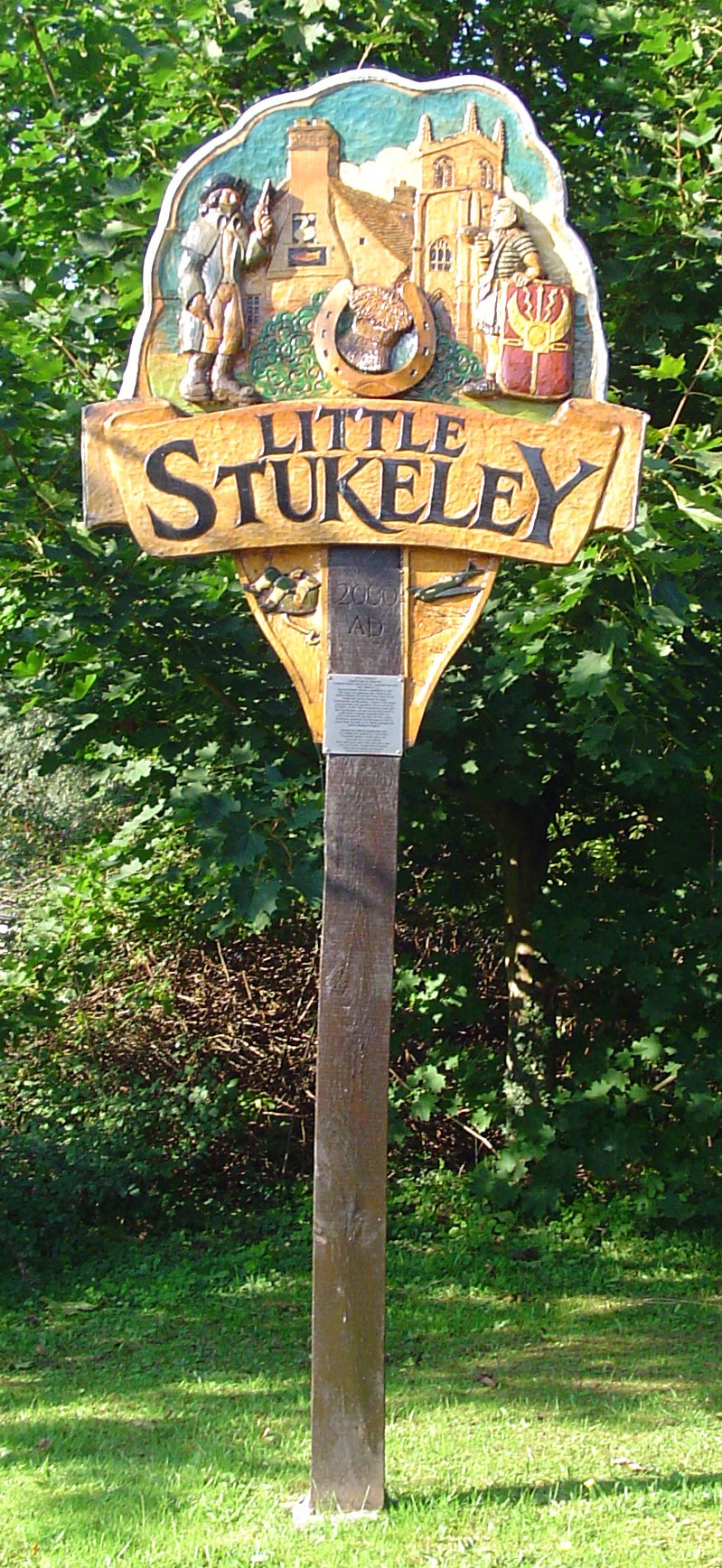
- Village sign in Little Stukeley

- Location within Cambridgeshire
- Population: 1,340 (2011 Census including Great Stukeley)
- OS grid reference: TL209756
- Civil parish: The Stukeleys
- District: Huntingdonshire
- Shire county: Cambridgeshire
- Region: East
- Country: England
- Sovereign state: United Kingdom
- Post town: Huntingdon
- Postcode district: PE28
- Dialling code: 01480
- UK Parliament: Huntingdon

Little Stukeley is a village and former civil parish, now in the parish of The Stukeleys, in Cambridgeshire, England. Little Stukeley lies approximately 3 miles (5 km) north-west of Huntingdon. Little Stukeley is situated within Huntingdonshire which is a non-metropolitan district of Cambridgeshire as well as being a historic county of England. In 1931 the parish had a population of 209.

The Alconbury Weald development is taking place near Little Stukeley.

== History ==
In 1085 William the Conqueror ordered that a survey should be carried out across his kingdom to discover who owned which parts and what it was worth. The survey took place in 1086 and the results were recorded in what, since the 12th century, has become known as the Domesday Book. Starting with the king himself, for each landholder within a county there is a list of their estates or manors; and, for each manor, there is a summary of the resources of the manor, the amount of annual rent that was collected by the lord of the manor both in 1066 and in 1086, together with the taxable value.

Little Stukeley was listed in the Domesday Book in the Hundred of Hurstingstone in Huntingdonshire; the name of the settlement was written as Stivecle in the Domesday Book. In 1086 there was just one manor at Little Stukeley; the annual rent paid to the lord of the manor in 1066 had been £6 and the rent was the same in 1086.

The Domesday Book does not explicitly detail the population of a place but it records that there were 19 households at Little Stukeley. There is no consensus about the average size of a household at that time; estimates range from 3.5 to 5.0 people per household. Using these figures then an estimate of the population of Little Stukeley in 1086 is that it was within the range of 66 and 95 people.

The Domesday Book uses a number of units of measure for areas of land that are now unfamiliar terms, such as hides and ploughlands. In different parts of the country, these were terms for the area of land that a team of eight oxen could plough in a single season and are equivalent to 120 acres (49 hectares); this was the amount of land that was considered to be sufficient to support a single family. By 1086, the hide had become a unit of tax assessment rather than an actual land area; a hide was the amount of land that could be assessed as £1 for tax purposes. The survey records that there were eleven ploughlands at Little Stukeley in 1086. In addition to the arable land, there was 24 acres (10 hectares) of meadows and 120 acres (49 hectares) of woodland at Little Stukeley.

The tax assessment in the Domesday Book was known as geld or danegeld and was a type of land-tax based on the hide or ploughland. It was originally a way of collecting a tribute to pay off the Danes when they attacked England, and was only levied when necessary. Following the Norman Conquest, the geld was used to raise money for the King and to pay for continental wars; by 1130, the geld was being collected annually. Having determined the value of a manor's land and other assets, a tax of so many shillings and pence per pound of value would be levied on the land holder. While this was typically two shillings in the pound the amount did vary; for example, in 1084 it was as high as six shillings in the pound. For the manor at Little Stukeley the total tax assessed was seven geld.

By 1086 there was already a church and a priest at Little Stukeley.

== Government ==
Little Stukeley is part of the civil parish of The Stukeleys, which has a parish council. The parish council is elected by the residents of the parish who have registered on the electoral roll; the parish council is the lowest tier of government in England. A parish council is responsible for providing and maintaining a variety of local services including allotments and a cemetery; grass cutting and tree planting within public open spaces such as a village green or playing fields. The parish council reviews all planning applications that might affect the parish and makes recommendations to Huntingdonshire District Council, which is the local planning authority for the parish. The parish council also represents the views of the parish on issues such as local transport, policing and the environment. The parish council raises its own tax to pay for these services, known as the parish precept, which is collected as part of the Council Tax. In 2015, The Stukeleys parish council had nine members; meetings were held on the first Monday of a month either in Great Stukeley Village Hall or in Little Stukeley Village Hall. On 1 April 1935 the parish of Little Stukeley was abolished to form "The Stukeleys".

Little Stukeley was in the historic and administrative county of Huntingdonshire until 1965. From 1965, the village was part of the new administrative county of Huntingdon and Peterborough. Then in 1974, following the Local Government Act 1972, Little Stukeley became a part of the county of Cambridgeshire.

The second tier of local government is Huntingdonshire District Council which is a non-metropolitan district of Cambridgeshire and has its headquarters in Huntingdon. Huntingdonshire District Council has 52 councillors representing 29 district wards. Huntingdonshire District Council collects the council tax, and provides services such as building regulations, local planning, environmental health, leisure and tourism. Little Stukeley is a part of the district ward of Alconbury and The Stukeleys and is represented on the district council by one councillor. District councillors serve for four-year terms following elections to Huntingdonshire District Council.

For Little Stukeley the highest tier of local government is Cambridgeshire County Council which has administration buildings in Cambridge. The county council provides county-wide services such as major road infrastructure, fire and rescue, education, social services, libraries and heritage services. Cambridgeshire County Council consists of 69 councillors representing 60 electoral divisions. Little Stukeley is part of the electoral division of Huntingdon and is represented on the county council by two councillors.

At Westminster Little Stukeley is in the parliamentary constituency of Huntingdon, and elects one Member of Parliament (MP) by the first past the post system of election. Little Stukeley is represented in the House of Commons by Ben Obese-Jecty (Conservative) since 2024. Jonathan Djanogly represented the constituency from 2001 to 2024. John Major (Conservative) represented the constituency between 1983 and 2001.

== Demography ==
=== Population ===
Parish	1911	1921	1931	1951	1961	1971	1981	1991	2001	2011
Great Stukeley	352	373	354							
Little Stukeley	240	228	209							
The Stukeleys	592	601	563	612	2,909	2,529	2,387	931	2,052	1,340

== Notable people ==
- Henry of Huntingdon (c.1088-1157), medieval historian
- Robert Ashington Bullen (1850–1912), geologist and authority on Mollusca, was Rector here 1898–1899.
- Pete Dyos, darts player.
