= Cambridgeshire County Council =

Elected body governing Cambridgeshire, England

Type
- Type: County council

Leadership
- Chair: Peter McDonald, Liberal Democrat since 20 May 2025
- Leader: Lucy Nethsingha, Liberal Democrat since 18 May 2021
- Chief Executive: Stephen Moir since 21 February 2022

Structure
- Seats: 61 councillors
- Political groups: Administration (33) Liberal Democrats (32) Independent (1) Other parties (28) Conservative (12) Reform (9) Labour (5) Green (2)
- Length of term: 4 years

Elections
- Voting system: First-past-the-post
- Last election: 1 May 2025

Meeting place
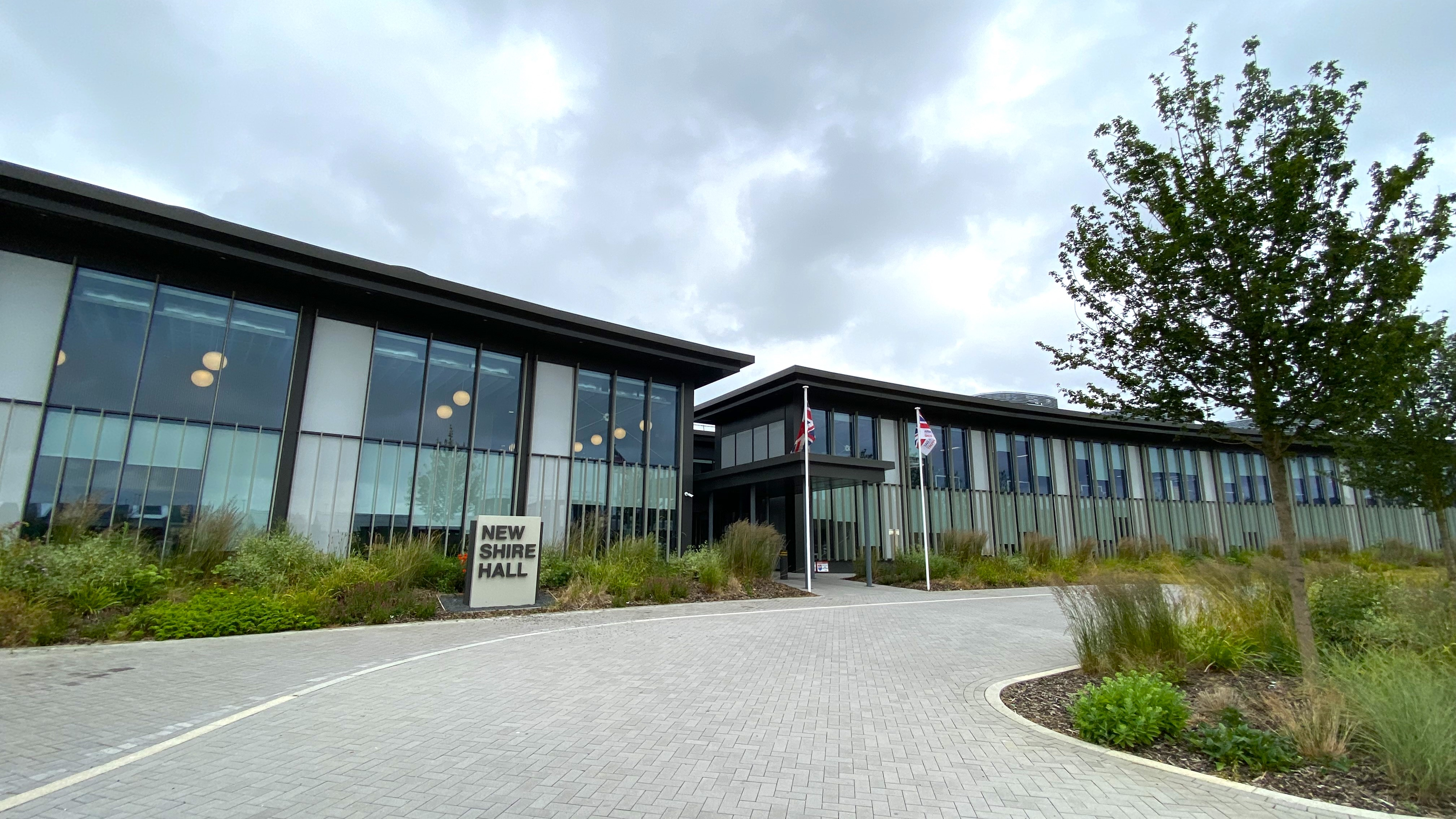
- New Shire Hall, Alconbury Weald, Huntingdon

Website
- www.cambridgeshire.gov.uk

Cambridgeshire County Council is the county council for non-metropolitan county of Cambridgeshire, England. The non-metropolitan county is smaller than the ceremonial county, which additionally includes the City of Peterborough. The county council consists of 61 councillors, representing 59 electoral divisions. The council is based at New Shire Hall in Alconbury Weald, near Huntingdon. It is part of the East of England Local Government Association and a constituent member of the Cambridgeshire and Peterborough Combined Authority.

Since May 2025, it has been run by a majority administration of Liberal Democrats.

== History ==
Cambridgeshire County Council was first formed in 1889 as a result of the Local Government Act 1888 as one of two county councils covering Cambridgeshire; the other was the Isle of Ely County Council. In 1965, the two councils were merged to form Cambridgeshire and Isle of Ely County Council.

This arrangement lasted until 1974, when, following the Local Government Act 1972, Cambridgeshire and the Isle of Ely were merged with Huntingdon and Peterborough to form a new non-metropolitan county of Cambridgeshire under the control of a newly constituted Cambridgeshire County Council. The first elections to the new authority were in April 1973, and the council took office on 1 April 1974.

From its re-creation in 1974 until 1998, the county council administered the entire county of Cambridgeshire. In 1998, Peterborough City Council became a unitary authority, thus outside the area of the county council. For ceremonial, geographic, and certain administrative purposes, however, Peterborough continues to be associated with and work in collaboration with Cambridgeshire County Council. Since 2017, the council has been a constituent member of the Cambridgeshire and Peterborough Combined Authority, led by the directly-elected Mayor of Cambridgeshire and Peterborough.

The council is responsible for public services such as education, transport, highways, heritage, social care, libraries, trading standards, and waste management.

== District councils ==
The county council is the upper-tier of local government, below which are five councils with responsibility for local services such as housing, planning applications, licensing, council tax collection and rubbish collection. This arrangement will be replaced with unitary authorities after Local Government Reorganisation in 2027-28. The districts of Cambridgeshire are:

- Cambridge City Council
- East Cambridgeshire District Council
- Fenland District Council
- Huntingdonshire District Council
- South Cambridgeshire District Council

== Political control ==
Following the 2025 Cambridgeshire County Council election the Liberal Democrats won a majority of the council's seats. They sit in a majority political group with an independent councillor.

Political control of the county council since the reforms of the Local Government Act 1972 took effect on 1 April 1974 has been as follows:

Party in control	Years
No overall control	1974–1977
Conservative	1977–1985
No overall control	1985–1989
Conservative	1989–1993
No overall control	1993–1997
Conservative	1997–2013
No overall control	2013–2017
Conservative	2017–2021
No overall control	2021–2025
Liberal Democrats	2025-present

=== Leadership ===
The leaders of the council since 1997 have been:

Councillor	Party	From	To
Keith Walters	Conservative	13 May 1997	15 May 2007
Shona Johnstone	Conservative	15 May 2007	12 Nov 2007
Keith Walters	Conservative	23 Nov 2007	May 2008
Jill Tuck	Conservative	13 May 2008	May 2011
Nick Clarke	Conservative	17 May 2011	May 2013
Martin Curtis	Conservative	21 May 2013	13 May 2014
Steve Count	Conservative	13 May 2014	May 2021
Lucy Nethsingha	Liberal Democrats	18 May 2021	

=== Composition ===
Following the 2025 election, and subsequent changes up to June 2026, the composition of the council is:

Party	Seats
Liberal Democrats	32
Conservative	11
Reform	8
Labour	5
Green	3
Independent	1
Vacant	1
Total	61

The Liberal Democrats and one Independent sit together as the majority Liberal Democrat and Independent Group.

In October 2025, Councillor Des Watt left Reform UK to sit as an independent. This left the Conservatives as the Main Opposition on the Council. In January 2026, Watt would briefly join Advance UK, before again becoming an independent in March. Later that August, Watt joined the Conservative Party.

In February 2026, Independent Councillor Tom Sanderson joined the Liberal Democrats.

In April 2026, Reform UK Councillor Andy Osborn was disqualified from office under the Representation of the People Act, after publishing a false statement about a Conservative candidate during the election campaign. The resulting by-election was narrowly held by Reform UK with a majority of 26 to the Conservative candidate.

In May 2026, the Reform UK Councillor for Ramsey and Bury, James Sidlow, resigned after 1 year. A by-election will be held on 16 July.

The next scheduled election is due on 3 May 2029. Expected local government reorganisation would mean that County Council will cease to exist on 1 April 2028.

== Premises ==
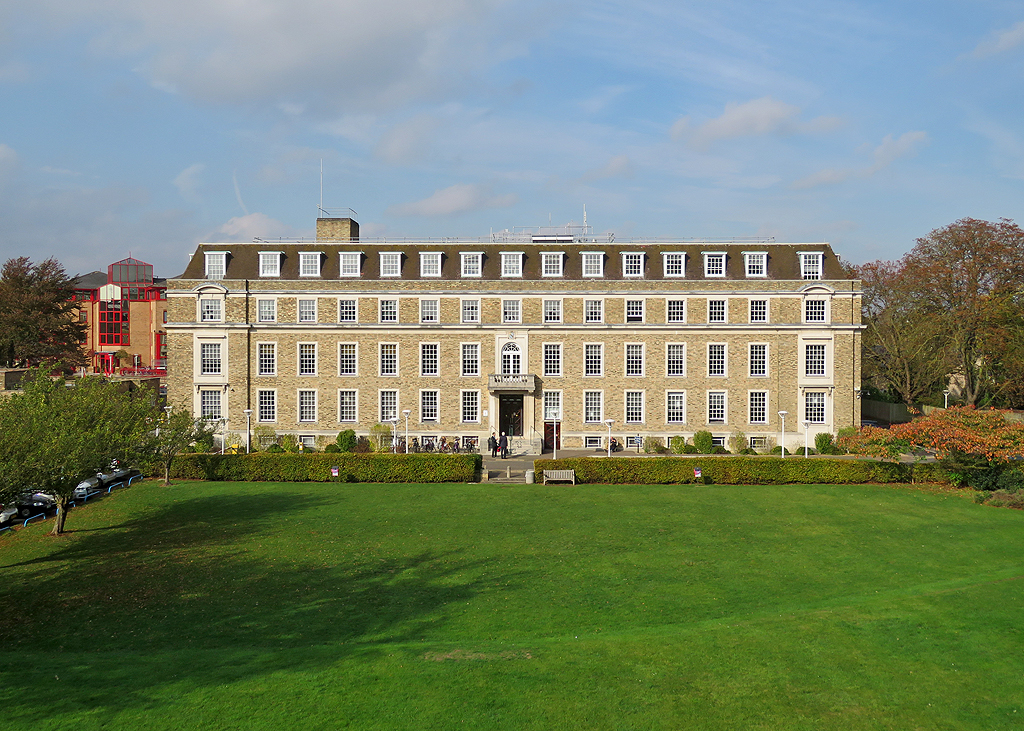
Shire Hall, Castle Hill, Cambridge: Council's headquarters 1932–2021.

Until 2021, the county council had its offices and meeting place in Cambridge, being based at different times at the Guildhall, County Hall, and Shire Hall.

In 2021 the council vacated Shire Hall and left Cambridge, moving to New Shire Hall at Alconbury Weald in the parish of The Stukeleys, north-west of Huntingdon. The first committee meeting to be held at New Shire Hall was in September 2021. An official opening ceremony for New Shire Hall was held on 8 July 2022.

== Elections ==
Since the last boundary changes in 2017, the council has comprised 61 councillors representing 59 electoral divisions, with most divisions electing one councillor but two divisions (March North & Waldersley and Sawston & Shelford) elect two councillors each. Elections are held every four years.

=== Councillors and electoral divisions ===
Electoral Division	Parishes	Councillor	Party
Abbey	Abbey	Elliot Tong	Green
Alconbury and Kimbolton	Alconbury, Alconbury Weston, Barham & Woolley, Brington & Molesworth, Buckworth, Bythorn & Keyston, Catworth, Covington, Easton, Ellington, Great Gidding, Great Staughton, Hail Weston, Hamerton & Steeple Gidding, Kimbolton, Leighton, Little Gidding, Old Weston, Perry, Spaldwick, Stow Longa, Tilbrook, Upton & Coppingford and Winwick	Ian Gardener	Conservative
Arbury	Arbury	Mike Black	Labour
Bar Hill	Bar Hill, Boxworth, Dry Drayton, Girton, Lolworth	Edna Murphy	Liberal Democrats
Brampton and Buckden	Brampton, Buckden, Diddington, Grafham, Offord Cluny & Offord D’Arcy and Southoe & Midloe	Liam Beckett	Liberal Democrats
Burwell	Burwell, Reach, Swaffham Bulbeck, Swaffham Prior	Yannifer Malinowski	Liberal Democrats
Cambourne	Bourn, Cambourne, Caxton, Little Gransden and Longstowe	Lucy Nethsingha	Liberal Democrats
Castle	Castle	Rory Clark	Liberal Democrats
Chatteris	Chatteris	Daniel Divine	Reform
Cherry Hinton	Cherry Hinton	Bryony Goodliffe	Labour
Chesterton	Chesterton	Ian Manning	Liberal Democrats
Cottenham and Willingham	Cottenham, Rampton and Willingham	Yasmin Deter	Liberal Democrats
Duxford	Babraham, Duxford, Fowlmere, Great Abington, Hinxton, Ickleton, Little Abington, Pampisford, Thriplow, Whittlesford	Peter McDonald	Liberal Democrats
Ely North	Ely	Alison Whelan	Liberal Democrats
Ely South	Ely, Stuntney	Christine Whelan	Liberal Democrats
Fulbourn	Fen Ditton, Fulbourn, Great Wilbraham, Horningsea, Little Wilbraham, Stow cum Quy, Teversham	Matthew Morgan	Liberal Democrats
Gamlingay	Arrington, Barrington, Croydon, Gamlingay, Guilden Morden, Steeple Morden, Tadlow, Hatley, Shingay-cum-Wendy, Abington Pigotts, Litlington; Orwell, Wimpole	James Stuart	Liberal Democrats
Godmanchester and Huntingdon South		Graham Wilson	Liberal Democrats
Hardwick	Barton, Caldecote, Childerley, Comberton, Coton, Grantchester, Hardwick, Kingston, Madingley, Toft	Christopher Morris	Liberal Democrats
Histon and Impington		Ros Hathorn	Liberal Democrats
Huntingdon North and Hartford		Leedo George	Conservative
Huntingdon West		Tom Sanderson	Liberal Democrats
King's Hedges	King's Hedges	Elisa Meschini	Labour
Linton	Balsham, Bartlow, Carlton, Castle Camps, Hildersham, Horseheath, Linton, Shudy Camps, West Wickham, West Wratting, Weston Colville	Henry Batchelor	Liberal Democrats
Littleport	Littleport	John Wells	Reform
Longstanton, Northstowe and Over		Luis Navarro	Liberal Democrats
March North and Waldersey	March	Stefan Fisher	Reform
March North and Waldersey	March	Colin Galbraith	Reform
March South and Rural	Benwick, March	Christopher Thornhill	Reform
Market	Market	Alex Beckett	Liberal Democrats
Melbourn & Bassingbourn	Foxton, Great and Little Chishill, Heydon, Melbourn, Meldreth, Shepreth	Adam Bostanci	Liberal Democrats
Newnham	Newnham	Peter Rees	Green
Papworth and Swavesey	Conington (S), Croxton, Elsworth, Eltisley, Fen Drayton, Graveley, Knapwell, Papworth Everard, Papworth St Agnes, Swavesey	Chris Poulton	Liberal Democrats
Petersfield	Petersfield	Richard Howitt	Labour
Queen Edith's	Queen Edith's	Karen Young	Liberal Democrats
Ramsey and Bury	Ramsey	James Sidlow	Reform
Roman Bank and Peckover	Gorefield, Leverington, Newton (F), Tydd St Giles, Wisbech	Vacant	
Romsey	Romsey	Darren Green	Green
Sawston and Shelford	Great Shelford, Harston, Hauxton, Little Shelford, Newton (S), Sawston, Stapleford	Laurence Damary-Homan	Liberal Democrats
Sawston and Shelford	Great Shelford, Harston, Hauxton, Little Shelford, Newton (S), Sawston, Stapleford	Peter Fane	Liberal Democrats
Sawtry and Stilton	Barham and Woolley, Brington and Molesworth, Buckworth, Bythorn and Keyston, Catworth, Conington (H), Easton, Ellington, Glatton, Great Gidding, Hamerton, Leighton, Little Gidding, Old Weston, Sawtry, Spaldwick, Steeple Gidding, Stow Longa, Upton and Coppingford, Winwick	Simon Bywater	Conservative
Soham North and Isleham	Chippenham, Fordham, Isleham, Kennett, Snailwell, Soham, Wicken	Mark Goldsack	Conservative
Soham South and Haddenham		Tom Hawker-Dawson	Liberal Democrats
Somersham and Earith	Bluntisham, Broughton, Colne, Earith, Old Hurst, Pidley cum Fenton, Somersham, Woodhurst	Charlotte Lowe	Conservative
St Ives North and Wyton	Holywell-cum-Needingworth, St Ives	Julie Kerr	Independent
St Ives South and Needingworth		Alex Bulat	Labour
St Neots East and Gransden	St Neots	Sarah Caine	Liberal Democrats
St Neots Eynesbury		Ricky Ioannides	Reform
St Neots Priory Park and Little Paxton		Robin Wyatt	Liberal Democrats
St Neots The Eatons		Geoffrey Seeff	Liberal Democrats
Sutton	Coveney, Downham, Mepal, Sutton, Wentworth, Witcham, Witchford	Lorna Dupré	Liberal Democrats
The Hemingfords & Fenstanton	Fenstanton, Hemingford Abbots, Hemingford Grey, Hilton, Houghton and Wyton	David Keane	Conservative
Trumpington		David Levien	Liberal Democrats
Warboys & the Stukeleys	Abbots Ripton, Bury, Houghton and Wyton, Kings Ripton, Upwood and the Raveleys, Warboys, Wistow, Wood Walton	Ross Martin	Conservative
Waterbeach	Landbeach, Milton, Waterbeach	Anna Bradnam	Liberal Democrats
Whittlesey North	Whittlesey	Chris Boden	Conservative
Whittlesey South	Whittlesey	Michael Fisher	Reform
Wisbech East	Wisbech	Samantha Hoy	Conservative
Wisbech West	Wisbech	Steve Tierney	Conservative
Woodditton	Ashley, Bottisham, Brinkley, Burrough Green, Cheveley, Dullingham, Kirtling, Lode, Stetchworth, Westley Waterless, Woodditton	Jonny Edge	Liberal Democrats
Yaxley and Farcet	Yaxley	Des Watt	Conservative

== Coat of arms ==
Coat of arms of Cambridgeshire County Council
Notes Granted on 1 November 1976. Escutcheon Or three Palets wavy alternating with two Palets Azure a Bordure Gules flory on the inner edge Or; the Shield ensigned by a Mural Crown Or. Supporters On either side a Great Bustard proper the exterior leg resting on a closed Book Gules garnished Or pendent from the neck of the dexter by a Cord Argent two keys in saltire wards uppermost uppermost and outwards Gules and from the neck of the sinister by a like Cord a Hunting Horn mouth to the dexter Or. Motto Corde uno sapientes simus (With one heart let us be men and women of understanding.) Banner the heraldic banner of the council Badge Within an Annulet ensigned by a Coronet a Bar Or between two Bars wavy Azure.

The council was granted a coat of arms on 1 November 1976. The three wavy blue lines represent the county's three main rivers of the Cam, Great Ouse and Nene, and the two straight lines represent the many drainage ditches in the Fens. Other parts of the design represent different parts of the county and the council's predecessors: the supporters are great bustards, birds which were formerly common in the Fens, the crossed keys are a symbol of Saint Peter, representing Peterborough, and the hunting horn is a symbol of the former county of Huntingdonshire. The birds stand on books representing the University of Cambridge.

== See also ==
- Cambridgeshire County Council elections
- UK Independence Party § Conduct of past and present councillors

New creation	County council 1889 – 1965	Succeeded by Cambridgeshire and Isle of Ely County Council
Preceded by Cambridgeshire and Isle of Ely County Council; Huntingdon and Peterborough County Council	County council 1974 – present	Current
