= County hall =

Building that houses the seat of local government for a county

A county hall or shire hall is a common name given to a building that houses the seat of local government for a county.

The location of the county hall has usually denoted the county town.

In the case of Surrey, England, when county boundaries changed the county hall remained in Kingston upon Thames. County halls usually contain a council chamber, committee rooms and offices.

== List of county and shire halls ==
=== United Kingdom ===
==== England ====
County halls in England, with the ceremonial county they served, include: (Note: Some of the English county councils have been abolished to make way for unitary authorities and the respective county halls have either been transferred to successor authorities or have been the subject of change of use)

Image	Name	Town or city	County	Years built	Style	Years in use	Reference
	Avon House	Bristol	Avon	1969–1972	International style	1974–1996: Avon County Council; 1996–1999: Bristol City Council; 1999–2024: private use as a hotel (demolished in 2025)	
	County Hall	Bedford	Bedfordshire	1965–1969	Brutalist style	1970–2009: Bedfordshire County Council; 2009–present: Bedford Borough Council	
	Shire Hall	Reading	Berkshire	1981	Brutalist style	1981–1998: Berkshire County Council; 2000–2017: Foster Wheeler AG; 2017–present: John Wood Group plc	
	City Hall	Bristol	Bristol	1938–1952	Neo-Georgian style	1956–present: Bristol City Council	
	County Hall	Aylesbury	Buckinghamshire	1964–1966	Brutalist style	1966–2020: Buckinghamshire County Council; 2020–present Buckinghamshire Council	
	Shire Hall	Cambridge	Cambridgeshire	1932	Neo-Georgian style	1932–2020: Cambridgeshire County Council; 2020–present: hotel and office development	
	New Shire Hall	Alconbury Weald	Cambridgeshire	2019–2020	Modern style	2020–present: Cambridgeshire County Council	
	County Hall	Chester	Cheshire	1938–1957	Neo-Georgian style	1957–2009: Cheshire County Council; 2009–present: University of Chester	
	Municipal Buildings	Middlesbrough	Cleveland	1883–1889	French Gothic Style	1889–1968: Middlesbrough Borough Council; 1968–1974: Teesside County Borough Council; 1974–1996: Cleveland County Council; 1966–present: Middlesbrough Council	
	Lys Kernow	Truro	Cornwall	1966	Brutalist style	1966–2009: Cornwall County Council; 2009–present: Cornwall Council	
	Cumbria House	Carlisle	Cumberland / Cumbria	2016	Modern style	2016–2023: Cumbria County Council; 2023–present: Cumberland Council	
	County Hall	Matlock	Derbyshire	1867	Victorian neo-gothic	1867–1955: Smedley's Hydropathic Hospital; 1955–present: Derbyshire County Council	
	County Hall	Exeter	Devon	1958–1964	Neo-classical style	1964–present: Devon County Council	
	County Hall	Dorchester	Dorset	1938–1955	Art Deco style	1955–2019: Dorset County Council; 2019–present: Dorset Council	
	County Hall	Durham	County Durham	1960–1963	Brutalist style	1963–present: Durham County Council	
	County Hall	Lewes	East Sussex	1968	Modern style	1968–present: East Sussex County Council; Also used by Lewes District Council	
	County Hall	Beverley	East Riding of Yorkshire	1881	Flemish Renaissance style	1889–1974: East Riding County Council; 1974–1996: Humberside County Council; 1996–present: East Riding of Yorkshire Council	
	County Hall	Chelmsford	Essex	1909	Neo-classical style	1909–present: Essex County Council	
	Shire Hall	Gloucester	Gloucestershire	1816	Neo-classical style	1816–present: Gloucestershire County Council	
	City Hall	London	Greater London	2012	Modern style	2012–present: Greater London Authority	
	County Hall	Manchester	Greater Manchester	1973	Modern style	1974–1986: Greater Manchester County Council; 1986–present: Commercial offices	
	Castle Hill	Winchester	Hampshire	1833	Elizabethan style	1889–present: Hampshire County Council	
	Shirehall	Hereford	Herefordshire	1817	Neo-classical style	1889–1974: Herefordshire County Council; 1998–present: Herefordshire Council	
	County Hall	Hertford	Hertfordshire	1939	Neo-Georgian style with Scandinavian elements	1939–present: Hertfordshire County Council	
	County Hall	Boston	Holland	1927	Gothic Revival style	1927–1974: Holland County Council; 1974–present:Public library	
	Walden House	Huntingdon	Huntingdonshire	1674	Jacobean style	1889–1965: Huntingdonshire County Council; 1965–1974: Huntingdon and Peterborough County Council; 1974–present: Municipal offices and then private apartments	
	County Hall	March	Isle of Ely	1909	Edwardian style	1909–1965: Isle of Ely County Council; 1974–present: Fenland District Council	
	County Hall	Newport	Isle of Wight	1938	Neo-Georgian style	1938–present: Isle of Wight County Council	
	County Hall	Maidstone	Kent	1824	Greek Revival style	1889–present: Kent County Council	
	County Offices	Sleaford	Kesteven	1856	Italianate style	1925–1974: Kesteven County Council; 1974–present: North Kesteven District Council	
	County Hall	Preston	Lancashire	1882	Queen Anne revival style	1889–present: Lancashire County Council	
	County Hall	Glenfield	Leicestershire	1967	Brutalist style	1967–present: Leicestershire County Council	
	County Offices	Lincoln	Lindsey / Lincolnshire	1932	Neo-Georgian style	1932–1974: Lindsey County Council; 1974–present: Lincolnshire County Council	
	The Guildhall	Westminster	Middlesex	1913	Neo-Gothic style	1913–1965: Middlesex County Council; 1965–2009: Used as a court 2009–present: Supreme Court of the United Kingdom	
	Metropolitan House	Liverpool	Merseyside	1974	Modern style	1974–1986: Merseyside County Council; 1986–present: Commercial offices	
	County Hall	Norwich	Norfolk	1968	Modern style	1968–present: Norfolk County Council	
	County Hall	Northampton	Northamptonshire	1845	Neo-classical style	1899–2021: Northamptonshire County Council; 2021–present: Tourist Information Centre	
	County Hall	Morpeth	Northumberland	1981	Modern style	1981–present: Northumberland County Council	
	County Hall	Northallerton	North Yorkshire	1906	Edwardian Baroque style	1906–1974: North Riding County Council; 1974–present: North Yorkshire County Council	
	County Hall	Nottingham	Nottinghamshire	1954	Modern style	1954–present: Nottinghamshire County Council	
	County Hall	Oxford	Oxfordshire	1841	Gothic Revival style	1899–present: Oxfordshire County Council	
	Catmose House	Oakham	Rutland	1781	Neo-classical style	1899–1974: Rutland County Council; 1997–present: Rutland County Council	
	Shirehall	Shrewsbury	Shropshire	1966	Modern style	1966–present: Shropshire County Council	
	County Hall	Taunton	Somerset	1935	Neo-Georgian style	1935–present: Somerset County Council	
	County Hall	Barnsley	South Yorkshire	1960	Brutalist style	1974–1986: South Yorkshire County Council; 1974–2015: Commercial offices (demolished in 2015)	
	County Buildings	Stafford	Staffordshire	1895	Baroque revival style	1899–present: Staffordshire County Council	
	Endeavour House	Ipswich	Suffolk	2003	Modern style	2003–present: Suffolk County Council	
	Woodhatch Place	Reigate	Surrey	1999	Modern style	2020–present: Surrey County Council	
	Sandyford House	Newcastle upon Tyne	Tyne and Wear	1974	Brutalist style	1974–1986: Tyne and Wear County Council; 1986–present: Commercial offices	
	Shire Hall	Warwick	Warwickshire	1758	Neo-classical style	1899–present: Warwickshire County Council	
	County Hall	Birmingham	West Midlands	1970	Brutalist style	1974–1986: West Midlands County Council; 1986–present: Commercial offices	
	County Hall	Kendal	Westmorland	1939	Neo-Georgian style	1939–1974: Westmorland County Council; 1974–2024: Municipal offices	
	County Hall	Chichester	West Sussex	1933	Neo-Georgian style	1933–present: West Sussex County Council	
	County Hall	Wakefield	West Yorkshire	1898	Gothic Revival style	1898–1974: West Riding County Council; 1974–1986: West Yorkshire County Council; 1986–present: Wakefield Metropolitan District Council	
	County Hall	Trowbridge	Wiltshire	1940	Neo-Georgian style	1940–present: Wiltshire County Council	
	County Hall	Worcester	Worcestershire	1978	Brutalist style	1978–1998: Hereford and Worcester County Council; 1998–present: Worcestershire County Council	

==== Scotland ====
County halls ceased to have a role in Scotland in 1975, when a system of large regional councils was introduced. Former county halls in Scotland, with the county they served, include: (Note: All of the Scottish county councils have been abolished to make way for regional authorities and subsequently unitary authorities and the respective county halls have either been transferred to successor authorities or have been the subject of change of use)

Image	Name	Town or city	County	Years built	Style	Years in use	Reference
	County Buildings	Aberdeen	Aberdeenshire	1896	Neoclassical style	1896–1975: Aberdeenshire County Council; 1975–present: commercial offices	
	County Buildings	Forfar	Angus	1843	Scottish baronial style	1890–1975: Forfarshire County Council; 1975–1996: Angus District Council; 1996–present: Angus Council	
	County Buildings	Inveraray	Argyll	1820	Neoclassical style	1890–1975: Argyll County Council; 1975–present: Visitor attraction	
	County Buildings	Ayr	Ayrshire	1818	Neoclassical style	1890–1975: Ayrshire County Council; 1975–1996: Strathclyde Regional Council; 1996–present: South Ayrshire Council	
	County Buildings	Banff	Banffshire	1871	Italianate style	1890–1975: Banffshire County Council; 1975–1996: Banff and Buchan District Council; 1996–present: Local courthouse	
	County Buildings	Duns	Berwickshire	1856	Jacobean style	1890–1975: Berwickshire County Council; 1975–1996: Berwickshire District Council; 1996–2015: Local courthouse	
	County Buildings	Rothesay	Buteshire	1835	Gothic Revival style	1890–1975: Bute County Council; 1975–2011: Local courthouse 2011–present: Private apartments	
	County Offices	Wick	Caithness	1820	Neo-Georgian style	1930–1975: Caithness County Council; 1975–2015: Offices for the delivery of local services	
	County Buildings	Alloa	Clackmannanshire	1865	Scottish baronial style	1890–1975: Clackmannanshire County Council; 1975–present: Local courthouse	
	County Buildings	Dumfries	Dumfriesshire	1914	Renaissance Revival style	1890–1975: Dumfriesshire County Council; 1975–1996: Dumfries and Galloway Regional Council; 1996–present: Dumfries and Galloway Council	
	County Buildings	Dumbarton	Dunbartonshire	1965	Brutalist style	1965–1975: Dunbartonshire County Council; 1975–2018: Offices for the delivery of local services	
	County Buildings	Haddington	East Lothian	1833	Gothic Revival style	1890–1975: East Lothian County Council; 1975–2015: Local courthouse	
	County Buildings	Cupar	Fife	1817	Neoclassical style	1890–1975: Fife County Council; 1975–1996: North East Fife District Council; 1996–present: Offices for the delivery of local services	
	County Buildings	Inverness	Inverness-shire	1876	Gothic Revival style	1930–1975: Inverness-shire County Council; 1975–1996: Highland Regional Council; 1996–present: Highland Council	
	County Buildings	Stonehaven	Kincardineshire	1865	Neoclassical style	1890–1935: Kincardineshire County Council; 1935–2015: Local courthouse	
	County Buildings	Kinross	Kinross-shire	1826	Neoclassical style	1890–1975: Kinross-shire County Council; 1975–present: Business centre	
	County Buildings	Kirkcudbright	Kirkcudbrightshire	1800	Neoclassical style	1925–1975: Kirkcudbrightshire County Council; 1975–1996: Stewartry District Council; 1996–present: Offices for the delivery of local services	
	County Buildings	Hamilton	Lanarkshire	1964	International style	1964–1975: Lanark County Council; 1975–present: South Lanarkshire Council	
	County Buildings	Edinburgh	Midlothian	1904	Palladian style	1904–1975: Midlothian County Council; 1975–1996: Lothian Regional Council; 1996–2018: Registrar's Office; 2018–present: French Consulate-General and the French Institute for Scotland	
	County Buildings	Elgin	Morayshire	1866	Neoclassical style	1890–1975: Moray County Council; 1975–present: Local courthouse	
	Town and County Buildings	Nairn	Nairnshire	1818	Neoclassical style	1890–1975: Nairn County Council; 1975–1996: Nairn District Council; 1996–present: Offices for the delivery of local services	
	County Buildings	Kirkwall	Orkney	1877	Scottish baronial style	1890–1975: Orkney County Council; 1975–present: Local courthouse	
	County Buildings	Peebles	Peeblesshire	1935	Baroque style	1935–1975: Peeblesshire County Council; 1975–1996: Tweeddale District Council; 1996–present: Offices for the delivery of local services	
	County Offices	Perth	Perthshire	1838	Neoclassical style	1930–1975: Perthshire County Council; 1975–1985: Perth and Kinross District Council; 1995–present: Public library	
	County Buildings	Paisley	Renfrewshire	1885	Neoclassical style	1890–1971: Renfrewshire County Council; 1971–present: Local courthouse	
	County Buildings	Dingwall	Ross and Cromarty	1965	Modern style	1965–1975: Ross and Cromarty County Council; 1975–present: Offices for the delivery of local services	
	County Offices	Newtown St Boswells	Roxburghshire	1968	Brutalist style	1968–1975: Roxburghshire County Council; 1975–1996: Scottish Borders Regional Council; 1996–present: Scottish Borders Council	
	County Buildings	Selkirk	Selkirkshire	1870	Scottish baronial style	1890–1975: Selkirkshire County Council; 1975–present: Local courthouse	
	County Buildings	Stirling	Stirlingshire	1855	Scottish baronial style	1931–1975: Stirlingshire County Council; 1975–1996: Central Regional Council; 1996–present: Stirling Council	
	County Offices	Golspie	Sutherland	1892	Victorian style	1892–1975: Sutherland County Council; 1975–1996: Sutherland District Council; 1996–2008: Offices for the delivery of local services 2008–present: Residential apartments	
	County Buildings	Linlithgow	West Lothian	1935	Neo-Georgian style	1935–1975: West Lothian County Council; 1975–2009: Offices for the delivery of local services 2018–present: Linlithgow Partnership Centre – Tam Dalyell House	
	County Buildings	Wigtown	Wigtownshire	1863	Gothic Revival style	1890–1975: Wigtownshire County Council; 1975–present: Offices for the delivery of local services	
	County Buildings	Lerwick	Zetland	1875	Scottish baronial style	1890–1975: Zetland County Council; 1975–present: Local courthouse	

==== Northern Ireland ====
County halls ceased to have a role in Northern Ireland in 1973, when a system of local government districts was introduced. Former county halls in Northern Ireland, with the county they served, include: (Note: All of the Northern Irish county councils have been abolished to make way for local government districts and the respective county halls have either been transferred to successor authorities or have been the subject of change of use)

Image	Name	Town or city	County	Years built	Style	Years in use	Reference
	County Hall	Ballymena	County Antrim	1970	Modern style	1970–1973: Antrim County Council; 1973–present: Government offices	
	Charlemont Place	Armagh	County Armagh	1830	Georgian style	1945–1973: Armagh County Council; 1973–present: Government offices	
	Downpatrick Courthouse	Downpatrick	County Down	1735	Neoclassical style	1899–1973: Down County Council; 1973–present: Local courthouse	
	County Buildings	Enniskillen	County Fermanagh	1960	Neo-Georgian style	1960–1973: Fermanagh County Council; 1973–2015: Government offices 2015–present: Offices for the delivery of local services	
	County Hall	Coleraine	County Londonderry	1970	Modern style	1970–1973: Londonderry County Council; 1973–present: Government offices	
	County Hall	Omagh	County Tyrone	1962	Modern style	1962–1973: Tyrone County Council; 1973–present: Government offices	

==== Wales ====
County halls in Wales, with the county they served, include: (Note: Some of the Welsh county councils have been abolished to make way for unitary authorities and the respective county halls have either been transferred to successor authorities or have been the subject of change of use)

Historic counties

Image	Name	Town or city	County	Years built	Style	Years in use	Reference
	Shire Hall	Llangefni	Anglesey	1899	Jacobethan style	1899–1974: Anglesey County Council; 1974–1996: Ynys Mon Borough Council; 1996–2019: Local registry office	
	Shire Hall	Brecon	Brecknockshire	1843	Neoclassical style	1889–1974: Brecknockshire County Council; 1974–present: Brecknock Museum / Y Gaer	
	County Hall	Caernarfon	Caernarfonshire	1863	Neoclassical style	1889–1974: Caernarfonshire County Council; 1974–2009: Local courthouse 2009–2018: Private residence 2018–present: Concert hall and restaurant	
	County Offices	Aberystwyth	Cardiganshire	1866	Hôtel de Ville style	1950–1974: Cardiganshire County Council; 1974–2012: Local registry office and courthouse	
	County Hall	Carmarthen	Carmarthenshire	1955	French Renaissance style	1955–1974: Carmarthenshire County Council; 1974–1996: Dyfed County Council; 1996–present: Carmarthenshire County Council	
	County Hall	Ruthin	Denbighshire	1909	Neoclassical style	1909–1974: Denbighshire County Council; 1974–1996: Glyndŵr District Council; 1996–present: Denbighshire County Council	
	County Hall	Mold	Flintshire	1967	Brutalist style	1967–1974: Flintshire County Council; 1974–1996: Clwyd County Council; 1996–present: Flintshire County Council	
	County Hall	Cardiff	Glamorganshire	1912	Beaux-Arts classical style	1912–1974: Glamorgan County Council; 1974–1996: Mid Glamorgan County Council; 1996–present: Cardiff University	
	County Hall	Dolgellau	Merionethshire	1825	Neoclassical style	1889–1952: Merionethshire County Council; 1952–2016: Local courthouse 2018–present: Dentist's practice	
	Shire Hall	Newport	Monmouthshire	1902	Edwardian style	1902–1974: Monmouthshire County Council; 1974–1978: Council workspace 2014–present: Private apartments	
	County Offices	Welshpool	Montgomeryshire	1931	Neo-Georgian style	1931–1974: Montgomeryshire County Council; 1974–1996: Montgomeryshire District Council; 1996–2025: Offices for the delivery of local services 2025–present: Residential care facility	
	Shire Hall	Haverfordwest	Pembrokeshire	1837	Neoclassical style	1889–1974: Pembrokeshire County Council; 1974–2003: Local courthouse 2010–present: Commercial offices	
	County Offices	Llandrindod Wells	Radnorshire	1900	Baroque Revival style	1950–1974: Radnorshire County Council; 1974–1996: Radnorshire District Council; 1996–present: Offices for the delivery of local services	

Preserved counties

Name	Town or city	County	Reference
County Hall	Mold	Clwyd	
County Hall	Carmarthen	Dyfed	
County Hall	Cwmbran	Gwent	
Council Offices	Caernarfon	Gwynedd	
County Hall	Cardiff (Cathays Park)	Mid Glamorgan	
County Hall	Llandrindod Wells	Powys	
County Hall	Cardiff (Butetown)	South Glamorgan	
County Hall	Swansea	West Glamorgan	

=== Republic of Ireland ===
County halls in the Republic of Ireland, with the county they serve, include:

Name	Town or city	County	Reference
County Buildings	Carlow	County Carlow	
Cavan Courthouse	Cavan	County Cavan	
County Building	Ennis	County Clare	
County Hall	Cork	County Cork	
County House	Lifford	County Donegal	
County Hall	Dún Laoghaire	Dún Laoghaire–Rathdown	
County Hall	Swords	Fingal	
County Hall	Galway	County Galway	
County Hall	Tralee	County Kerry	
County Building	Naas	County Kildare	
County Hall	Kilkenny	County Kilkenny	
County Hall	Portlaoise	County Laois	
County Hall	Carrick-on-Shannon	County Leitrim	
Civic Offices	Limerick	County Limerick	
County Hall	Longford	County Longford	
County Hall	Dundalk	County Louth	
County Hall	Castlebar	County Mayo	
County Hall	Navan	County Meath	
County Offices	Monaghan	County Monaghan	
County Hall	Tullamore	County Offaly	
County Hall	Roscommon	County Roscommon	
County Hall	Sligo	County Sligo	
County Hall	Tallaght	South Dublin	
Civic Offices	Nenagh	County Tipperary (formerly North Tipperary)	
Civic Offices	Clonmel	County Tipperary (formerly South Tipperary)	
Civic Offices	Dungarvan	County Waterford	
County Buildings	Mullingar	County Westmeath	
County Hall	Wexford	County Wexford	
County Buildings	Wicklow	County Wicklow	

== See also ==
- Seat of local government
- Old County Hall, Truro
- Old Shirehall, Shrewsbury
- Old Shire Hall, Durham
- Shire Hall, Howden
