= List of county councils in England =

Two-tier non-metropolitan county councils in England (red).

There are currently 23 county councils in England, which serve areas known as non-metropolitan counties. 21 of the county councils serve as the upper-tier authorities in a two-tier arrangement; their areas are divided into a number of non-metropolitan districts, which each have a district council. Durham County Council and Northumberland County Council are unitary authorities, which combine county and district functions.

The first county councils were created in 1889 under the Local Government Act 1888. There was a significant reform of the number, powers and jurisdictions of county councils in 1974. County councils were also established for the metropolitan counties created in 1974, but the metropolitan county councils were all abolished in 1986. From 1995 onwards numerous unitary authorities have been created.

== Current two-tier ==
Local authority	Established	District councils	Administration	Website	Headquarters
Cambridgeshire County Council	1974^{Cambs}	5	Liberal Democrats	Official website	New Shire Hall, Alconbury Weald
Derbyshire County Council	1889	8	Reform	Official website	County Hall, Matlock
Devon County Council	1889	8	Coalition: Liberal Democrats; Green; Independents	Official website	County Hall, Exeter
East Sussex County Council	1889	5	Conservative	Official website	County Hall, Lewes
Essex County Council	1889	12	Reform	Official website	County Hall, Chelmsford
Gloucestershire County Council	1889	6	No Overall Control	Official website	Shire Hall, Gloucester
Hampshire County Council	1889	11	No Overall Control	Official website	Castle Hill, Winchester
Hertfordshire County Council	1889	10	Liberal Democrats (minority)	Official website	County Hall, Hertford
Kent County Council	1889	12	Reform	Official website	County Hall, Maidstone
Lancashire County Council	1889	12	Reform	Official website	County Hall, Preston
Leicestershire County Council	1889	7	No Overall Control	Official website	County Hall, Glenfield
Lincolnshire County Council	1974	7	Reform	Official website	County Offices, Lincoln
Norfolk County Council	1889	7	No Overall Control	Official website	County Hall, Norwich
Nottinghamshire County Council	1889	7	Reform	Official website	County Hall, West Bridgford
Oxfordshire County Council	1889	5	Liberal Democrats	Official website	County Hall, Oxford
Staffordshire County Council	1889	8	Reform	Official website	County Buildings, Stafford
Suffolk County Council	1974	5	Reform	Official website	Endeavour House, Ipswich
Surrey County Council	1889	11	Conservative	Official website	Woodhatch Place, Reigate
Warwickshire County Council	1889	5	No Overall Control	Official website	Shire Hall, Warwick
West Sussex County Council	1889	7	No Overall Control	Official website	County Hall, Chichester
Worcestershire County Council	1998^{Worcs}	6	No Overall Control	Official website	County Hall, Worcester

== Current unitary ==
Local authority	Established	Became unitary	Administration	Website	Headquarters
Durham County Council	1974	2009	Reform	Official website	County Hall, Durham
Northumberland County Council	1974	2009	Conservative Party	Official website	County Hall, Morpeth

The unitary authority which calls itself Rutland County Council is legally a district council which also performs county functions rather than a county council, despite its corporate branding. The unitary authorities of Bristol City Council, Buckinghamshire Council, Dorset Council, East Riding of Yorkshire Council, and Herefordshire Council share their geographic name with a ceremonial county (and they are identical in Bristol's and Herefordshire's case) but are likewise legally district councils that also perform county functions.

== Former ==
Local authority	Established	Abolished
Avon County Council	1974	1996
Bedfordshire County Council	1889	2009
Berkshire County Council	1889	1998
Buckinghamshire County Council	1889	2020
Cambridgeshire County Council	1889	1965^{Cambs}
Cambridgeshire and Isle of Ely County Council	1965	1974
Cheshire County Council	1889	2009
Cleveland County Council	1974	1996
Cornwall Council	1974	2009
Cumberland County Council	1889	1974
Cumbria County Council	1974	2023
Dorset County Council	1889	2019
East Riding County Council	1889	1974
East Suffolk County Council	1889	1974
Greater Manchester County Council	1974	1986
Hereford and Worcester County Council	1974	1998
Herefordshire County Council	1889	1974
Holland County Council	1889	1974
Humberside County Council	1974	1996
Huntingdon and Peterborough County Council	1965	1974
Huntingdonshire County Council	1889	1965
Isle of Ely County Council	1889	1965
Isle of Wight Council	1974	1995
Kesteven County Council	1889	1974
Lindsey County Council	1889	1974
London County Council	1889	1965
Merseyside County Council	1974	1986
Middlesex County Council	1889	1965
Monmouthshire County Council	1889	1974^{Mon}
North Riding County Council	1889	1974
North Yorkshire Council	1974	2023
Northamptonshire County Council	1889	2021
Rutland County Council	1889	1974
Shropshire Council	1980	2009
Soke of Peterborough County Council	1889	1965
Somerset Council	1974	2023
South Yorkshire County Council	1974	1986
Tyne and Wear County Council	1974	1986
West Midlands County Council	1974	1986
Westmorland County Council	1889	1974
West Riding County Council	1889	1974
West Suffolk County Council	1889	1974
West Yorkshire County Council	1974	1986
Wiltshire Council	1974	2009
Worcestershire County Council	1889	1974^{Worcs}

== Footnotes ==
- ^Cambs: 1st creation 1889—1965; 2nd creation 1974—present
- ^Worcs: 1st creation 1889—1974; 2nd creation 1998—present
- ^Mon: Monmouthshire considered part of Wales from 1974.

== See also ==
- Unitary authorities of England
