= 1924 Fermanagh County Council election =

Local election in Northern Ireland

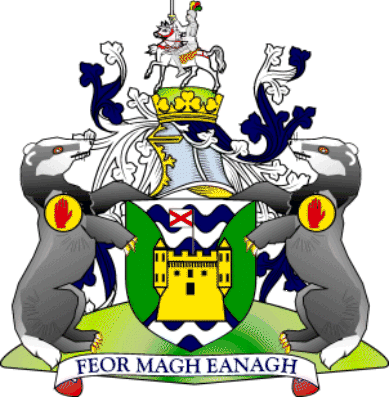
	Majority party	Minority party
Party	Ulster Unionist Party	Nationalist Party
Seats won	21	2

The 1924 Fermanagh County Council election was scheduled to held in June 1924 alongside the 1924 Northern Ireland local elections. It was designed to elect 20 councillors to Fermanagh County Council and was the first local election held in County Fermanagh since the partition of Ireland. Due to protests in the way the council had been run and due to gerrymandering of the voting districts by the Parliament of Northern Ireland, Irish nationalist parties boycotted the election, allowing the Ulster Unionist Party to win all seats unopposed, though 2 nationalist councillors were later co-opted in.

== Background ==
Originally elections to Fermanagh County Council had been held under single transferrable vote. In the 1920 Fermanagh County Council election, the Nationalist Party and Sinn Fein held a nationalist majority. Shortly before the partition of Ireland, the council voted in 1921 to declare that they would not recognise the Parliament of Northern Ireland and declared allegiance to the unrecognised Second Dail based in Southern Ireland. In response, the Royal Irish Constabulary ejected them from their offices and the council was temporarily dissolved with the Northern Irish government appointing commissioners to replace the council.

By the time the council was re-established, the Parliament of Northern Ireland had passed the Local Government Act (Northern Ireland) 1922 which abolished proportional representation and redrew the county district boundaries to favour the Unionists. The act also required elected members to swear an oath of allegiance. As a result of this, the nationalist parties boycotted participating in the election. In April 1924, the nominations were closed and revealed that only Ulster Unionist Party members had stood unopposed and were thus declared as elected in 19 of the 20 seats with no nominations arriving in time for the district of Belleek.

== Aftermath ==
When the council first convened in June, the Earl of Belmore initially took the chair due to him having an ex officio seat on the county council as the chairman of Enniskillen Rural Council. The council voted to co-opt two more members. The UUP's James Cooper and the Nationalist Party's James O'Donnell accepted co-option after unanimous approval of the council. Cooper then took over as chairman. The vacant seat was also filled by co-option with the Nationalist Party's James Gavin being co-opted. There was an objection from Doon councillor W. J. Brown who felt the council should not appoint its political opponents. However, Brown's amending motion failed to receive a seconder and Gavin was formally co-opted on a majority vote with only Brown dissenting.
