= Fenland Hall, March =

Municipal building in March, Cambridgeshire, England

Fenland Hall
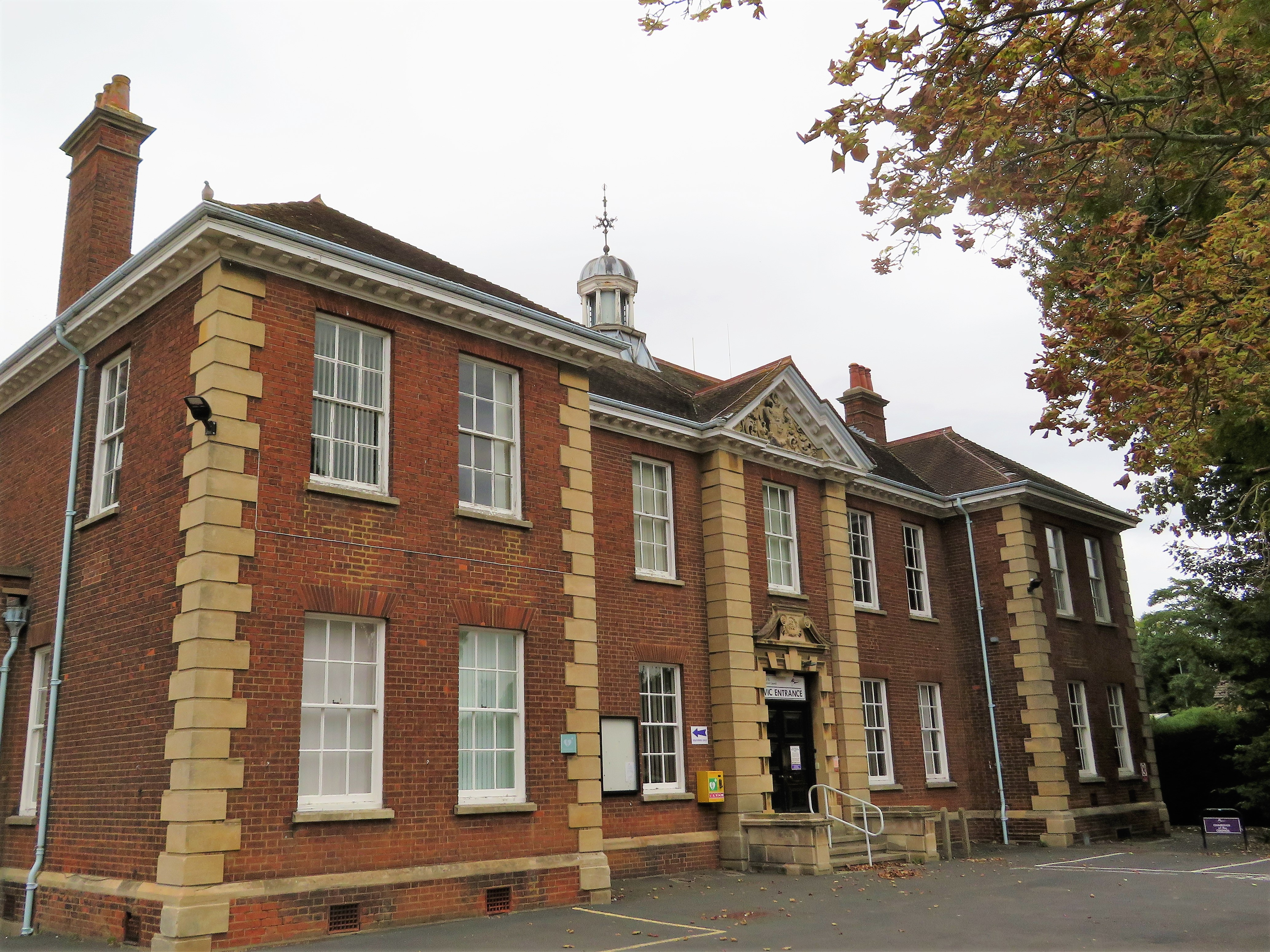

- Location within Cambridgeshire
- Former names: County Hall

General information
- Architectural style: Edwardian
- Location: Fenland Hall, County Road, March, PE15 8NQ, March, United Kingdom
- Coordinates: 52.55776°N 0.09097°E
- Completed: 1909

Design and construction
- Architect: Herbert John Green

Fenland Hall is a municipal building on County Road, March, Cambridgeshire, England, which serves as the headquarters of Fenland District Council. The building was originally called "County Hall", and was built in 1908–1909 by Isle of Ely County Council to be its meeting place and offices.

== History ==
Isle of Ely County Council was created in 1889 under the Local Government Act 1888. The Isle of Ely Quarter Sessions, which preceded the county council, had met alternately at Ely and Wisbech. The county council decided instead to hold its meetings in March, being a more central location within the Isle, and with better railway connections. For the first twenty years after its creation the county council met at the Temperance Hall in March, an assembly hall and hotel which had been built in 1885 opposite March railway station (and which was later renamed the Station Hotel).

After nearly twenty years of meeting at the Temperance Hall, in which time the council's staff were based in various rented offices, the council decided to build itself a purpose-built headquarters. The council acquired a site west of Station Road, close to March station. The building was designed by Herbert John Green and the main building contractor was Reuben Shanks of Chatteris. The cost of the building was £4,295. The building was formally opened on 28 July 1909 by Joseph Martin, the chairman of the council, and called "County Hall".

As originally constructed, the building included a council chamber, two large committee rooms, strong rooms and offices for the council's staff, and a caretaker's flat. The road leading from Station Road to the new building was later named County Road.

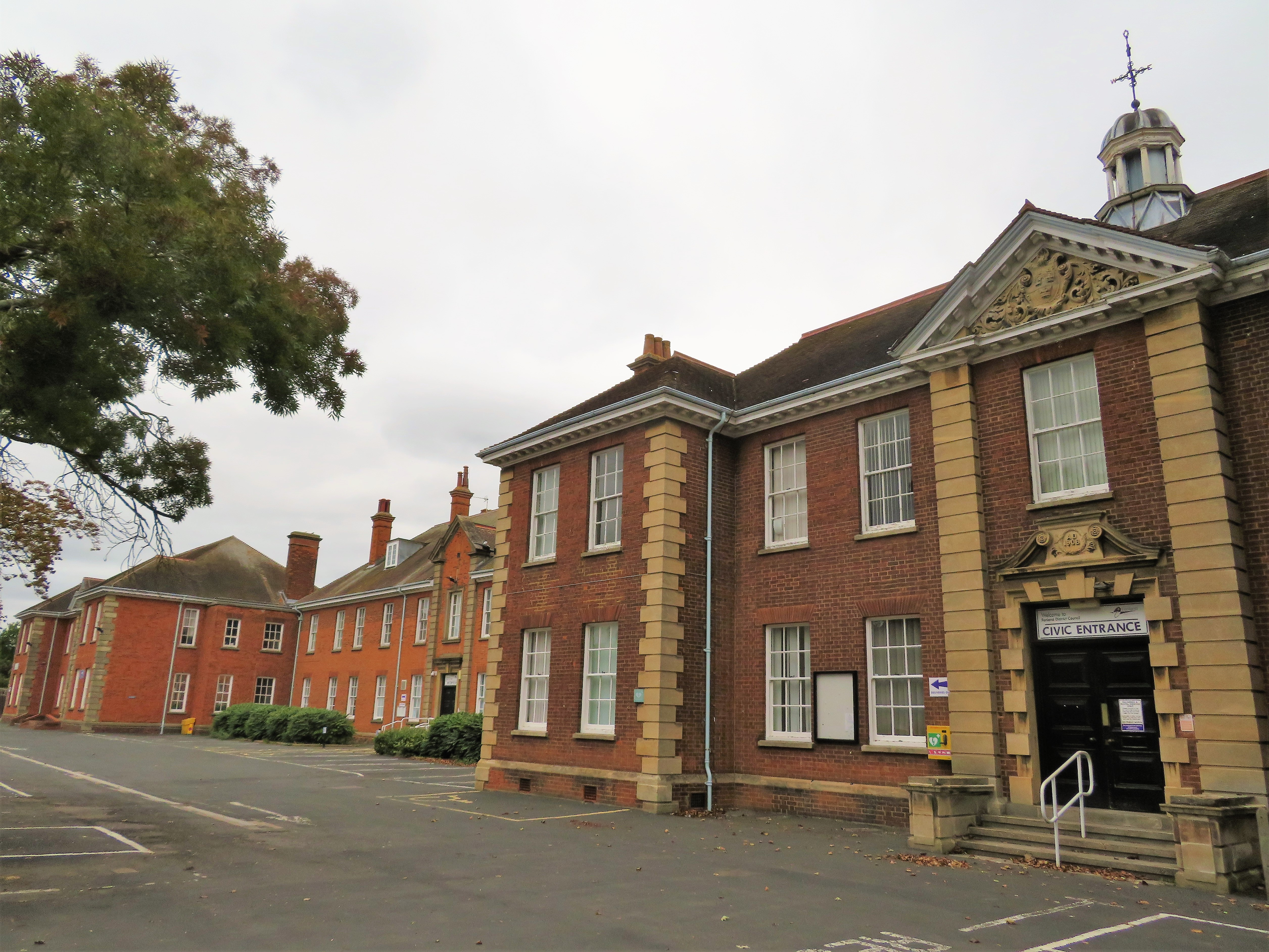
Wider view showing 1928 and 1937 wings to west (left) of 1909 original.

The building was subsequently extended in 1928 and again in 1937. Each extension took the form of a linked block in a similar style to the 1909 original at the eastern end of the site.

Isle of Ely County Council was abolished in 1965, merging with neighbouring Cambridgeshire County Council to become a short-lived authority called Cambridgeshire and Isle of Ely County Council. Local government was reformed again in 1974 under the Local Government Act 1972. The town of March became part of the Fenland district of an enlarged Cambridgeshire. The new Fenland District Council took over the County Hall buildings in March, renaming the building Fenland Hall.

As at 2022, Fenland Hall continues to serve as the main offices and meeting place of Fenland District Council.
