= Crumlin Road Courthouse =

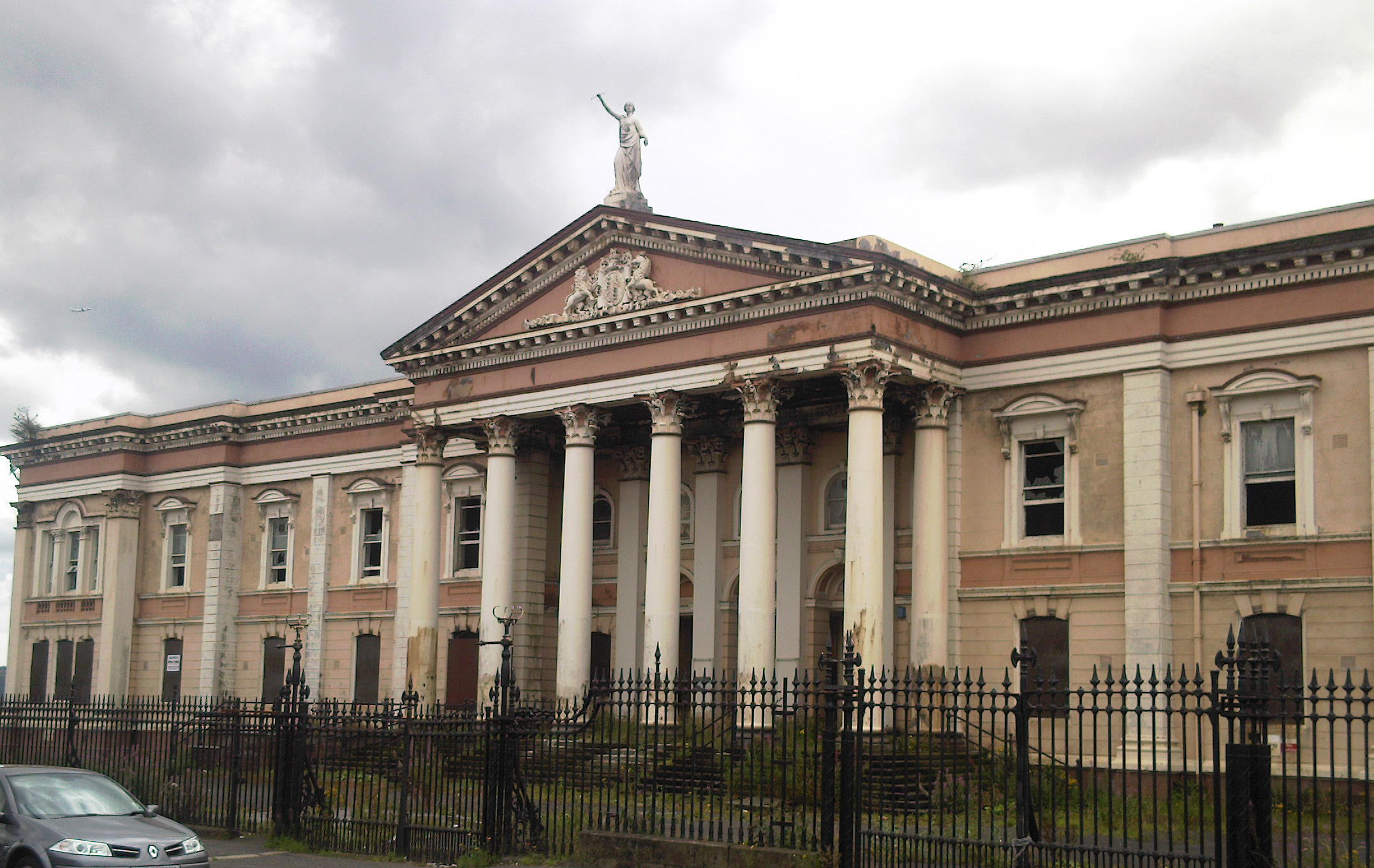
- Crumlin Road Courthouse

- Shown in Northern Ireland
- 54.608°N 5.943°W
- Location: Crumlin Road, Belfast

History
- Built: 1850

Site notes
- Architect: Charles Lanyon
- Architectural style: Neoclassical style

Listed Building – Grade B+
- Official name: Courthouse, Crumlin Road, Belfast
- Designated: 4 February 1988
- Reference no.: HB 26/35/006

The Crumlin Road Courthouse is a former judicial facility on Crumlin Road in Belfast, Northern Ireland. It is a Grade B+ listed building.

== History ==
The building, which was designed by the architect, Charles Lanyon, in the Neoclassical style, was completed in 1850. It was built just across the road from the Crumlin Road Gaol which had opened a few years earlier and to which it was connected by an underground passage. The design involved a symmetrical main frontage with fifteen bays facing onto Crumlin Road; the central section featured a hexastyle portico with Corinthian order columns supporting an entablature and a pediment containing the Royal coat of arms. A sculpture representing justice by William Boyton Kirk was installed at the apex of the pediment.

The building was originally used as a facility for dispensing justice but, following the implementation of the Local Government (Ireland) Act 1898, which established county councils in every county, it also became the meeting place for Antrim County Council. The building was enlarged to the designs of architects, Young and Mackenzie, in 1906. In the 1960s, county leaders decided that the courthouse was too cramped to accommodate the county council in the context of the county council's increasing administrative responsibilities, especially while the courthouse was still acting as a facility for dispensing justice, and therefore chose to move to new premises at County Hall in Ballymena in 1970.

Pending the opening of the Laganside Courts Complex, judicial hearings were temporarily transferred to other courts to allow the Crumlin Road Courthouse to close in June 1998. The Crumlin Road Courthouse was sold to local investor Barry Gilligan in September 2003 for £1. His plans for the courthouse included redeveloping it as a tourist attraction and a hotel. The courthouse suffered significant damage in a fire on 12 March 2009 and in two fires in August 2009.

After the former Crumlin Road Gaol building directly across the road became a visitor attraction in November 2012, there was extensive discussion about as to how the area could be regenerated. In March 2017, Lawrence Kenwright, from the Signature Living Group, bought the courthouse site and announced plans to convert the building into a hotel. The building was further damaged in yet another large fire on 1 June 2020. In 2024, the courthouse was purchased by property developer and Donegal Orange Order Grand Master, David Mahon. Potential new uses reportedly include a hotel or a hospital. The building is pending redevelopment.
