= Antrim County Council =

Local authority of County Antrim, 1899–1973

History
- Founded: 1 April 1899
- Disbanded: 1 October 1973
- Succeeded by: Antrim Borough Council; Ballymena Borough Council; Ballymoney Borough Council; Belfast City Council; Carrickfergus Borough Council; Larne Borough Council; Lisburn City Council; Moyle District Council; Newtownabbey Borough Council

Meeting place
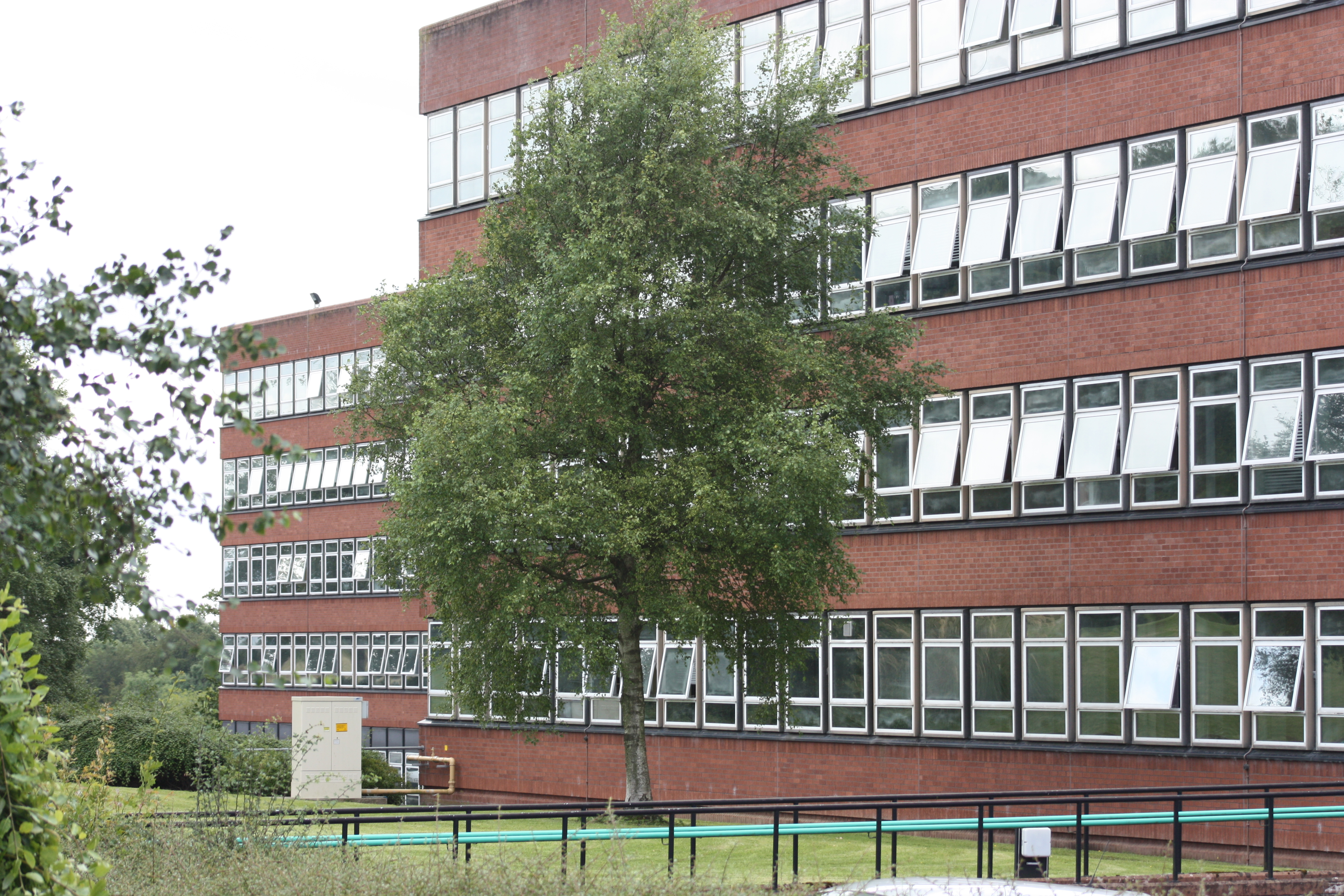
- County Hall, Ballymena

Antrim County Council was the authority responsible for local government in County Antrim, Northern Ireland, from 1899 to 1973.

== History ==
Antrim County Council was formed under orders issued under the Local Government (Ireland) Act 1898 which came into effect on 1 April 1899. It was the council for the administrative county of Antrim, which included the existing judicial county of Antrim, except the part in the city of Belfast; the existing judicial county of the town of Carrickfergus; and the part of the existing judicial county of Down containing the town of Lisburn.

The Local Government (Ireland) Act 1919 introduced proportional representation by means of the single transferable vote (PR-STV) for the 1920 Antrim County Council election. PR-STV was abolished in Northern Ireland under the Local Government Act 1922, with a reversion to first-past-the-post for the 1924 Northern Ireland local elections, the first local elections held in the new jurisdiction.

It was originally based at the Crumlin Road Courthouse but moved to County Hall in Ballymena in 1970. It was abolished on 1 October 1973 under the Local Government Act (Northern Ireland) 1972.
