= Enniskillen Courthouse =

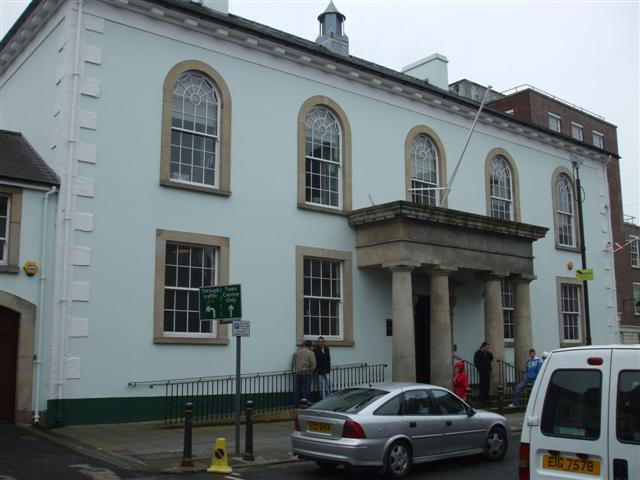
- Enniskillen Courthouse

- Shown in Northern Ireland
- 54.3437°N 7.6363°W
- Location: Enniskillen, County Fermanagh

History
- Built: 1785; 241 years ago

Site notes
- Architect: William Farrell
- Architectural style: Neoclassical style

Listed Building – Grade B2
- Official name: Courthouse, East Bridge Street, Enniskillen
- Designated: 26 August 1977
- Reference no.: HB 12/17/016

Enniskillen Courthouse is a judicial facility in East Bridge Street, Enniskillen, County Fermanagh, Northern Ireland. It is a Grade B listed building.

== History ==
The East Bridge Street site had previously been occupied by a gaol which had been built on the initiative of a Captain Cole who secured permission to proceed with the development in May 1613. The design also involved a sessions house which was built on piers over the gaol which was itself constructed in a vault below ground. Some rebuilding eventually became necessary and the current structure dates to around 1785.

After a new gaol had been built in Gaol Square to a design by Sir Richard Morrison in 1815, the East Bridge Street gaol became redundant and so the structure was altered to the designs of William Farrell in the Neoclassical style in 1822. The new design involved a symmetrical main frontage with five bays facing onto East Bridge Street; there were square sash windows on the ground floor, rounded headed sash windows on the first floor and a cornice decorated with modillions at roof level: the central section featured a prominent single-storey portico with four Doric order columns supporting a heavy entablature.

The building was originally used as a facility for dispensing justice but, following the implementation of the Local Government (Ireland) Act 1898, which established county councils in every county, it also became the meeting place for Fermanagh County Council. In the 1950s, county leaders decided that the courthouse was too cramped to accommodate the county council in the context of the county council's increasing administrative responsibilities, especially while the courthouse was still acting as a facility for dispensing justice, and therefore chose to acquire additional premises at County Buildings in May 1960.

The courthouse continued to operate as a venue for administering justice until it closed in 1969; however, following a major restoration, it re-opened again on 11 September 1982. In May 2012 the justice minister, David Ford, said that he accepted an inspection report recommending that the Enniskillen Courthouse should be designated a "satellite court" in a proposed rationalisation of the court system. It was downgraded to the status of a "hearing centre", with hearings scheduled for just three days a week, in July 2016.
