= Grand Hotel, Sheringham =

Grand Hotel
- Norfolk

General information
- Status: Demolished
- Type: Hotel
- Architectural style: Victorian
- Location: Sheringham, North Norfolk, Norfolk, England, The Esplanada; Sheringham; Norfolk
- Coordinates: 52°56′45.53″N 1°12′23.38″E
- Completed: 1898
- Opening: 1898
- Demolished: 1974

Other information
- Number of rooms: 105 Facilities Ballroom; Bowling Green; Billiards Room

The Grand Hotel was a large Victorian hotel in the English seaside resort town of Sheringham in the county of Norfolk. It was demolished in 1974.

== Location ==
The hotel was situated on the landward side of The Esplanada on the western side of the town. The hotel was on the sea front on the cliff top above the towns main beach. The site is now used partly as a car park and a small scale housing development.

== Description ==
The hotel was an impressive looking building which included two large domes on the roof, one on each corner. The hotel was designed by the Norwich architect Herbert John Green who was also the church Diocesan Surveyor of Norwich. The hotel was part of a rapid development of the resort following the arrival of the railway in to the town.

The hotel suffered a decline with the rapid expansion of the overseas package holiday business in the 1960s. It closed and was demolished in 1974. The site was later redeveloped into seven blocks of flats and a car park.
