= Sandyford House =

County building in Newcastle upon Tyne, Tyne and Wear, England

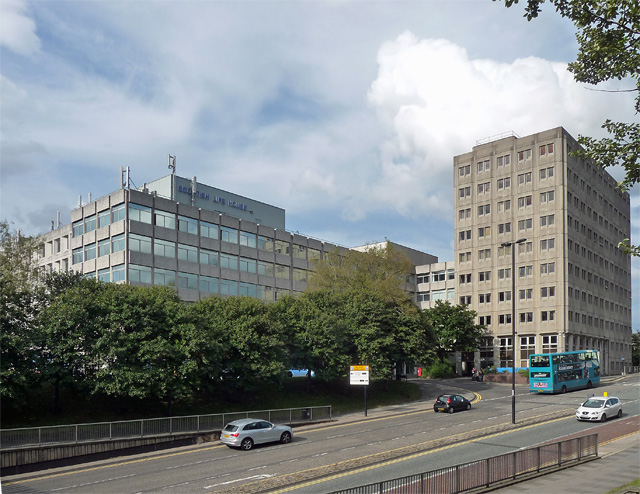
- Sandyford House (taller building to right), with Scottish Life House to left

- Location within Tyne and Wear

General information
- Architectural style: Brutalist style
- Location: Sandyford, Newcastle upon Tyne, United Kingdom
- Coordinates: 54.9815°N 1.6058°W
- Completed: c.1974

Sandyford House is a large office development on Sandyford Road in Sandyford, Newcastle upon Tyne. It was the offices and meeting place of Tyne and Wear County Council from its formation in 1974 until it was abolished in 1986.

== History ==
The building formed part of a wider initiative in the early 1970s to redevelop a residential area known as Archbold Terrace. The complex included a 6-storey office block at the back (i.e. north) of the site, a 6-storey office block at the front left (i.e. south west) known as Scottish Life House and a 10-storey tower block at the front right (i.e. south east) as well as a public house known as the Royal Archer. The design of the public house was commended by the Royal Institute of British Architects in 1976.

Sandyford House, which was designed in the brutalist style and built by Sir Robert McAlpine with a reinforced concrete frame, was completed in c.1974. The design of the complex allowed vehicle access to Sandyford House from the south through an opening in the main frontage of Scottish Life House; Sandyford House became the offices and meeting place of Tyne and Wear County Council when it was formed in April 1974. The punk comic Viz, established by Chris Donald in 1979, was also based in the complex.

After Tyne and Wear County Council was abolished in 1986, Sandyford House was adapted for use by the Department of Social Security. In the 1990s a 5-storey block on the east side of the complex was occupied by the energy efficiency business, Eaga, and became known as "Eaga House". The whole complex was acquired by the developer, Jomast, in 2004, who branded it Jesmond Three Sixty. After Eaga moved to Partnership House in Gosforth in 2009, Jomast submitted proposals to Newcastle City Council for the conversion of Eaga House into apartments, a project which was completed in January 2016. The developer went on to present proposals for the conversion of Sandyford House into apartments as well in December 2017.

Following the acquisition and demolition of the former Quaker Meeting House, located on an adjacent site on the east side, Jomast also presented proposals to build an 18-storey tower in the area.
