= Soke of Peterborough County Council =

History
- Founded: 1 April 1889
- Disbanded: 1 April 1965
- Succeeded by: Huntingdon and Peterborough County Council

Meeting place
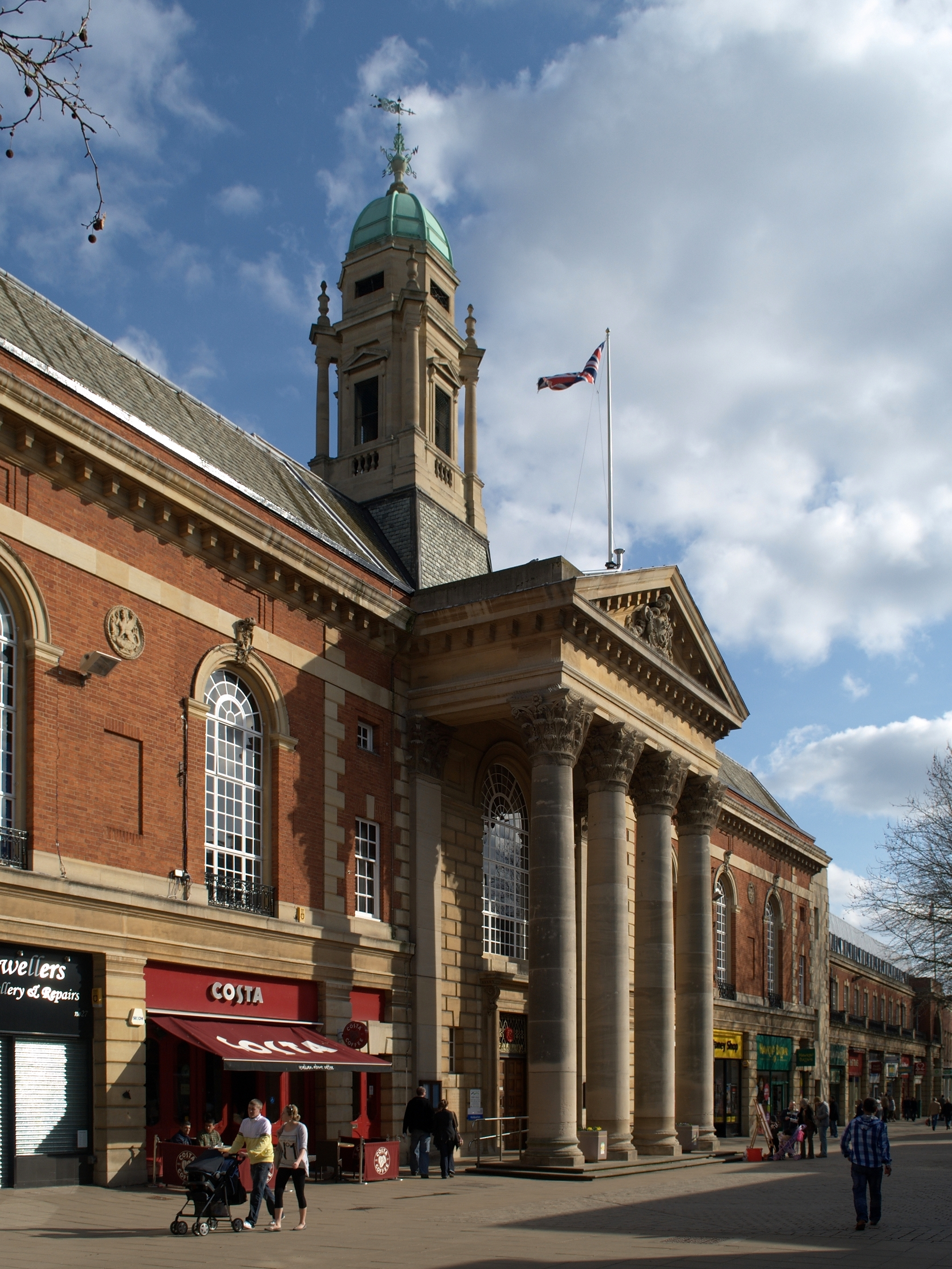
- County Offices, Peterborough

Soke of Peterborough County Council was the county council of the Soke of Peterborough, a self-governing division within the historic county of Northamptonshire.

It came into its powers on 1 April 1889 and was abolished on 1 April 1965. The county council was based at County Offices, Peterborough. It was amalgamated with Huntingdonshire County Council to form Huntingdon and Peterborough County Council in 1965.
