= Herbert John Green =

British architect

Herbert John Green (1850/51 – 1918) was an English architect who was born near Ipswich in the English county of Suffolk.

== Profile ==
He trained for the profession as a pupil under Sir Arthur Blomfield and worked from his offices once he was qualified. By 1881 he had progressed and had his own independent practice and had offices in Norwich and in Lincoln's Inn Fields in London. His works include the renovation of a large number of churches in Norfolk. He also designed the Grand Hotel on the North Norfolk coast in the town of Sheringham. He was the diocesan surveyor for the Anglican Diocese of Norwich from 1881 to 1898.

== Bankruptcy ==
In 1894 Green was judged bankrupt, but his work was continued and project references to him as an architect continue thereafter. He is recorded as living in the same house in Norwich from 1891 to 1901.

== List of Works ==
England

- Shadwell Court, Brettenham, Norfolk (1900)
- Bank House, Cromer, Norfolk (1896)
- St. Margaret's Church, Fleggburgh, Norfolk
- Carnegie Library, King's Lynn, Norfolk (1904)
- St. Andrew's Church, Guist, Norfolk (1880s)
- St Margaret's Church, Hales, Norfolk (1890s)
- St. George's Church, Hindolveston, Norfolk (designed only, built in the 1930s)
- All Saints' Church, Lessingham, Norfolk (1890s)
- Riddlesworth Hall, Riddlesworth, Norfolk (1900)
- The Esplanada, Sheringham, Norfolk
- The Grand Hotel, Sheringham, Norfolk (1898)
- Church of St. Peter and St. Paul, Shernborne, Norfolk (1898)
- Thetford Guildhall, Thetford, Norfolk

== Gallery ==
Buildings and structures of H J Green

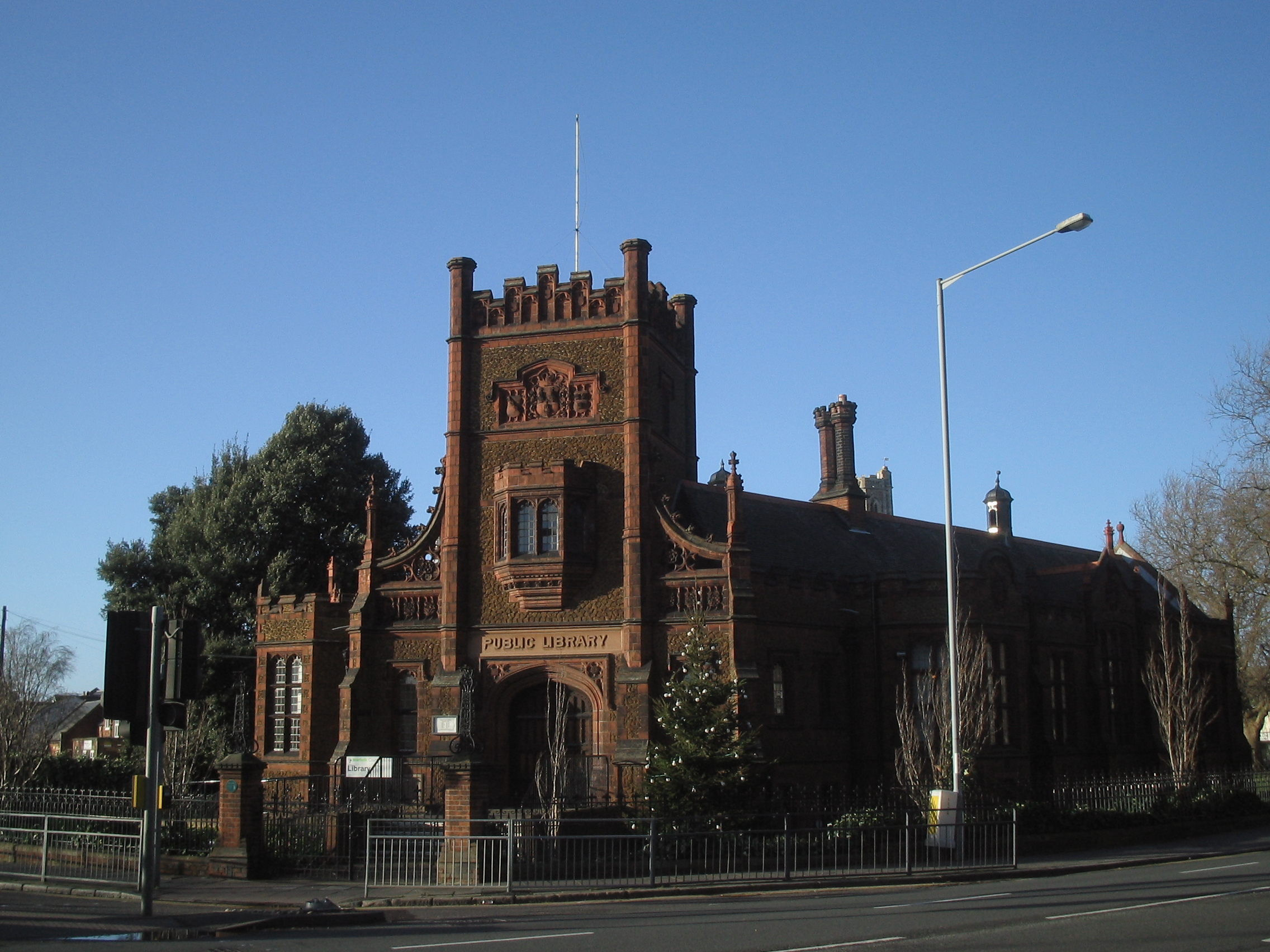
King's Lynn Carnegie Library, built in 1904

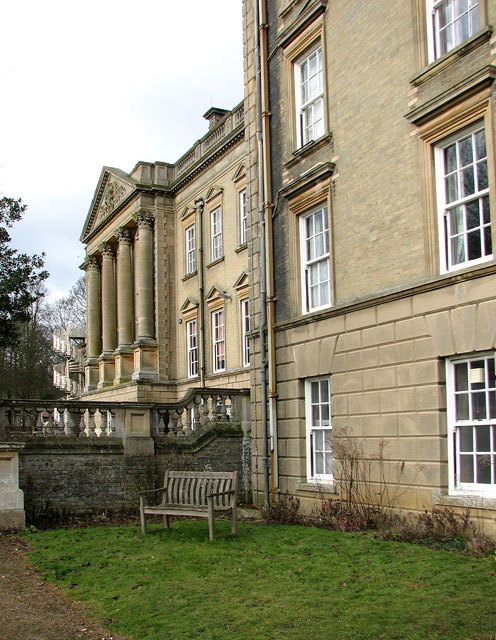
Riddlesworth Hall, Nr Diss, Norfolk, built 1900

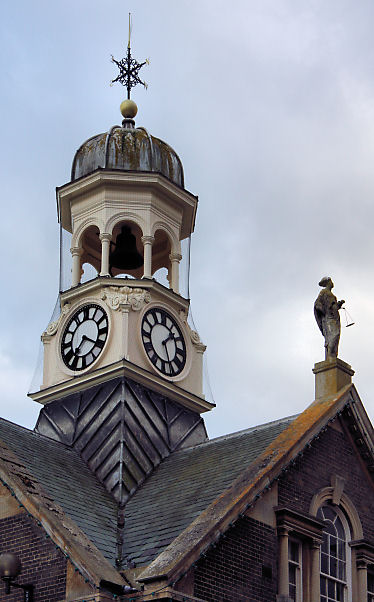
Thetford Guildhall: the clock tower

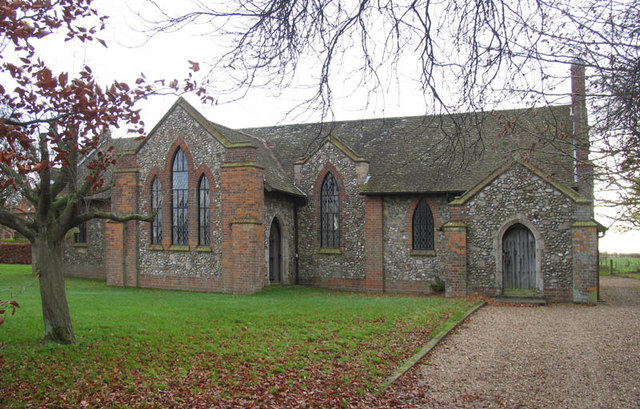
St George Parish Church, Hindolveston, Re-Build 1914

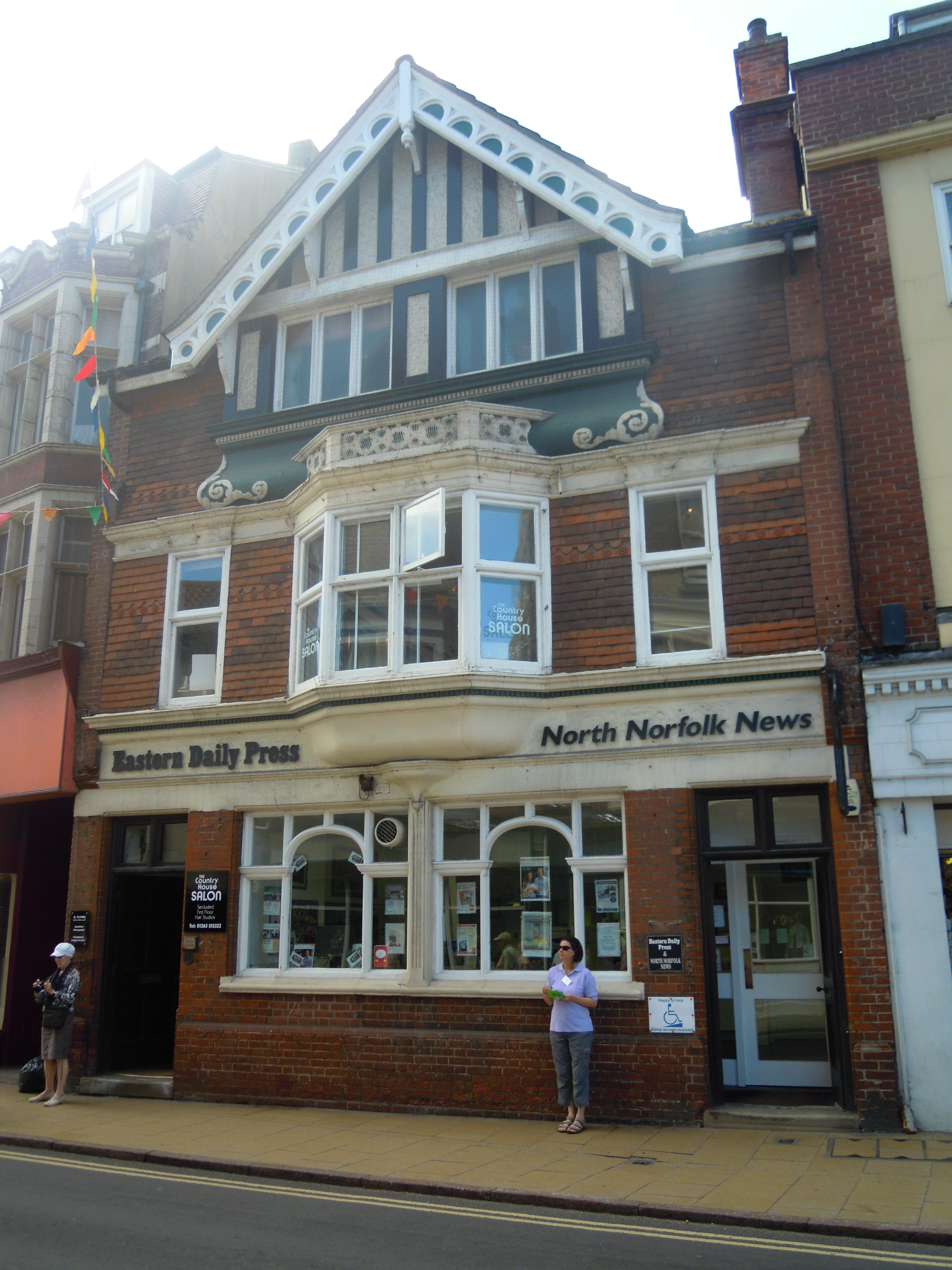
Bank House in Cromer, Norfolk, built in 1896

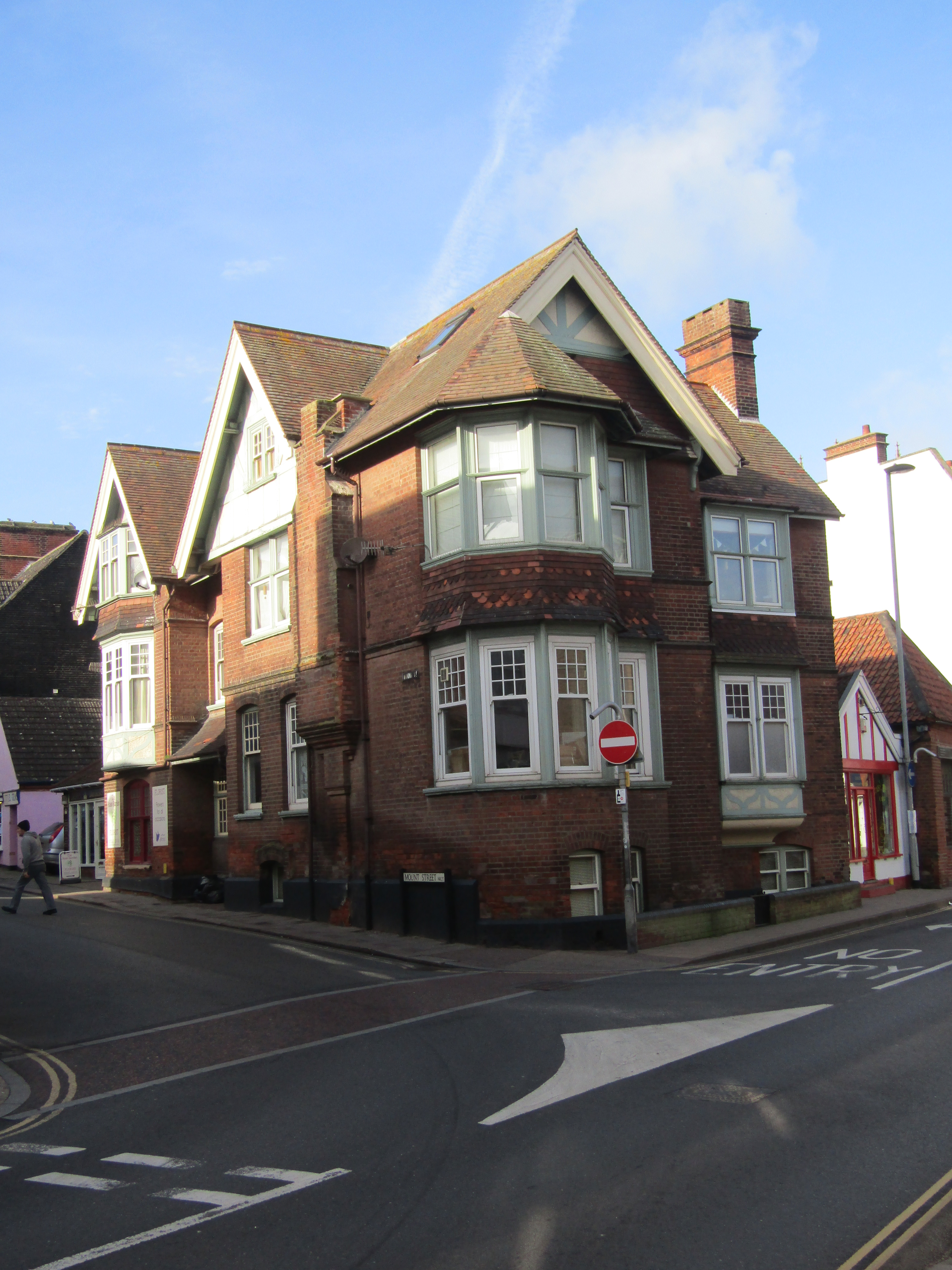
Building on the corner of Church Street and Mount Street

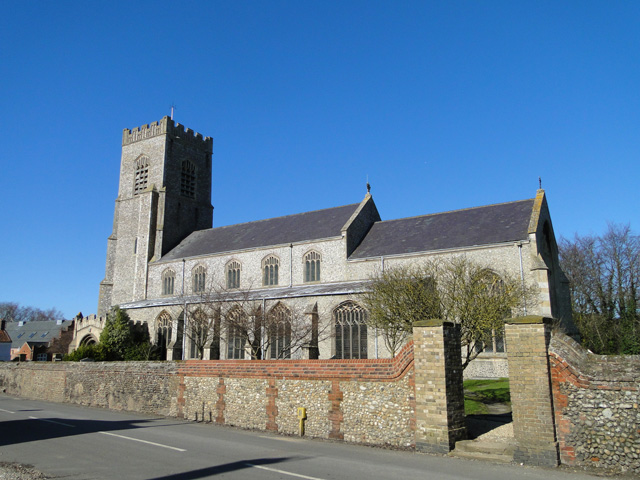
Parish church of Saint Nicolas, Wells-next-the-Sea
