= Huntingdon and Peterborough County Council =

- Coat of arms adopted in December 1964

Type
- Type: County council
- Houses: Unicameral

History
- Founded: 1 April 1965
- Disbanded: 1 April 1974
- Preceded by: Huntingdonshire County Council; Soke of Peterborough County Council
- Succeeded by: Cambridgeshire County Council
- Seats: 64 councillors; 21 aldermen

Elections
- Councillors voting system: First-past-the-post
- Aldermen voting system: Indirect election
- First Councillors election: 19 November 1964
- First Aldermen election: 1 December 1964
- Last Councillors election: 9 April 1970
- Last Aldermen election: 21 April 1970

Motto
- Cor unum (Latin) transl. One heart

Meeting place
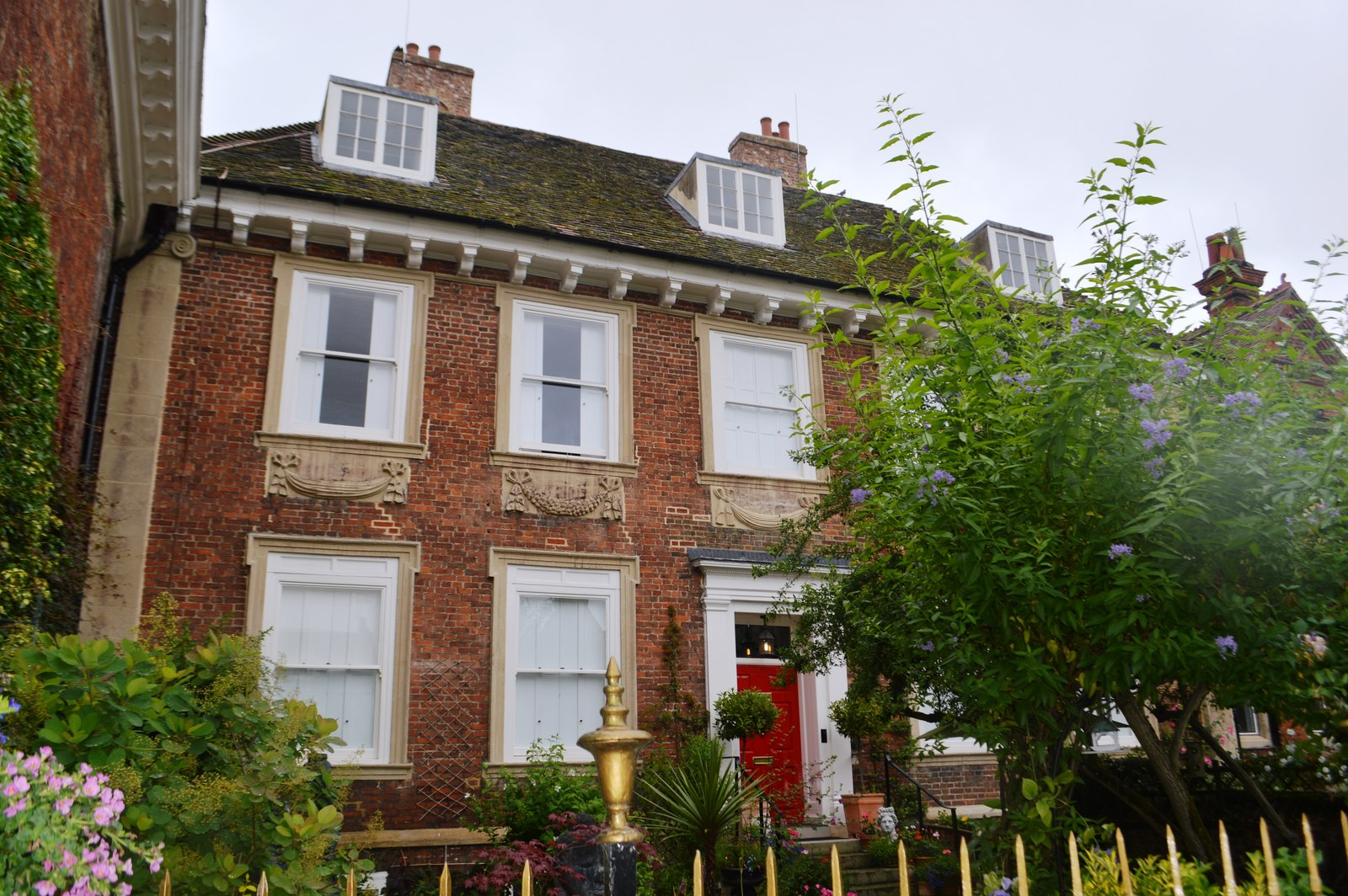
- County Buildings, Huntingdon
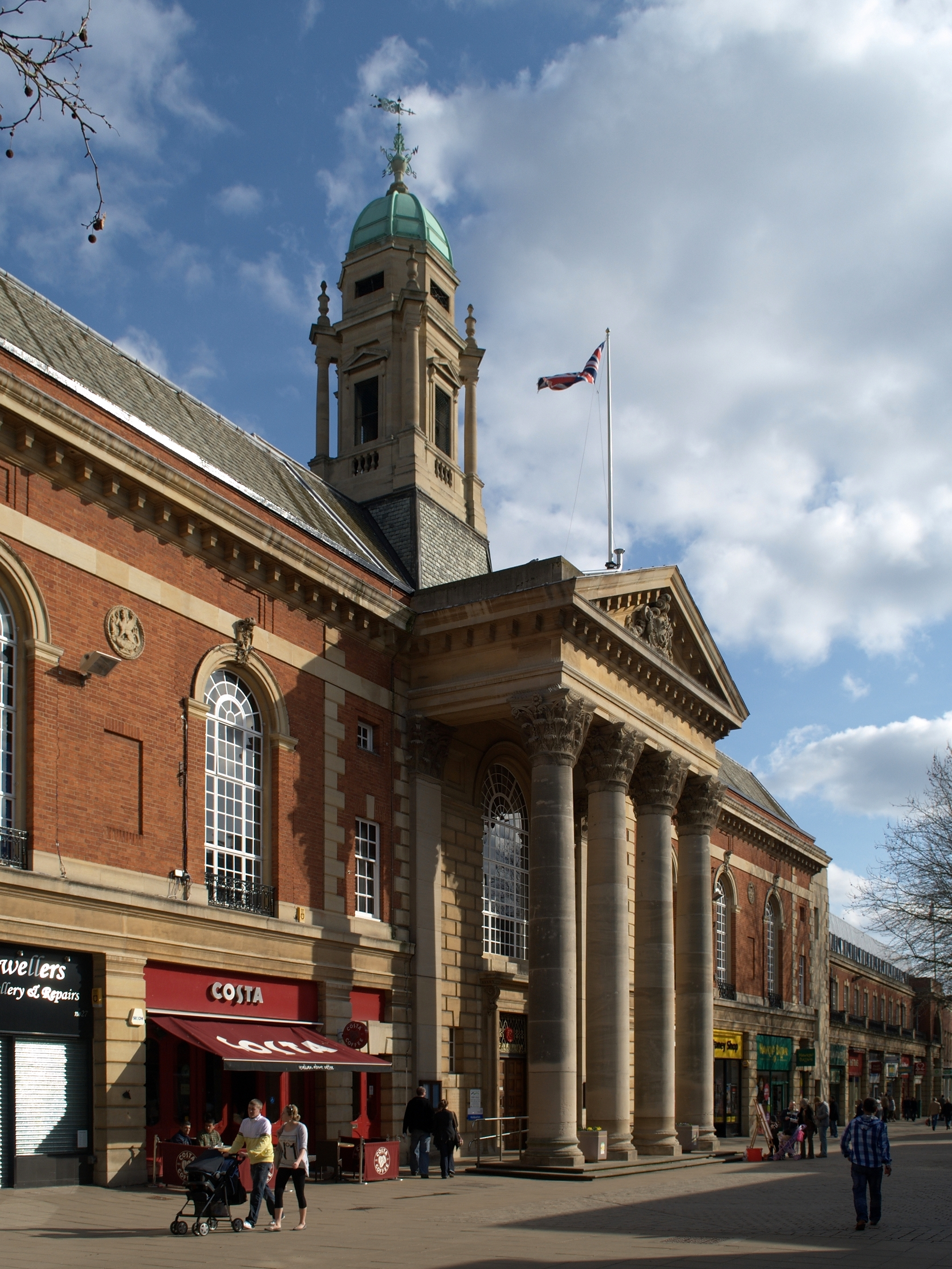
- Town Hall, Peterborough

Huntingdon and Peterborough County Council was the short-lived county council of Huntingdon and Peterborough in the east of England. The amalgamation of county councils covering small counties in the region was anticipated for many years prior to its creation. The merger was finally approved in March 1964 and elections to the new authority took place on 19 November 1964. The new council formally took over on 1 April 1965 when the predecessor Huntingdonshire County Council and Soke of Peterborough County Council were abolished. The location of the meeting place of the county council was contentious and meetings initially alternated between Peterborough and Huntingdon. Plans for a new county hall in Hinchingbrooke Park were delayed indefinitely and all meetings took place in Huntingdon from 1967. Things did not remain settled and the council was proposed to be abolished in 1969. It was merged with Cambridgeshire and Isle of Ely County Council to form Cambridgeshire County Council, on 1 April 1974.

== History ==
=== Background ===
In March 1945, William Beecroft Buckle, the coroner of the Soke of Peterborough and clerk of Peterborough Rural District Council, set out detailed proposals for a new 'county of Peterborough' made up of the Soke of Peterborough, Huntingdonshire, Isle of Ely and part of Northamptonshire. This was in response to a local government white paper published in January 1945. The Local Government Boundary Commission was set up in October 1945 and published its first report on 22 April 1947. The commission found that the Soke of Peterborough, Huntingdonshire and the Isle of Ely were too small for effective administration. A variety of conflicting proposals for amalgamations were received by the commission. On 8 April 1948, the commission recommended the amalgamation of Cambridgeshire, the Isle of Ely, Huntingdonshire and the Soke of Peterborough into a single county. These proposals did not proceed and the work of the commission was wound up in 1949.

The idea of amalgamation returned in 1960 when the Local Government Commission for England published their draft proposals for the area. Cambridgeshire, Huntingdonshire, the Isle of Ely and the Soke of Peterborough would be combined as a single county. The proposals were not well received. At the subsequent conference of local authorities in 1960, some councils supported the idea of a merger of Huntingdonshire with the Soke of Peterborough. In 1961 the final proposals were published. Huntingdonshire and the Soke of Peterborough would merge to form a new county. This was supported by Huntingdonshire County Council and the Soke of Peterborough County Council. The creation of the county and county council on 1 April 1965 was approved by the UK Government in March 1964. Provision was made for elections to the new authority to take place ahead of the merger in order to give time to prepare.

=== Creation of the council ===
A joint committee of the predecessor authorities was set up in 1964. Dennis Herbert, who had been chairman of Huntingdonshire County Council, was acting chairman. The first election of 64 councillors to the new authority took place on 19 November 1964. 36 councillors were elected from the Huntingdonshire area and 28 from the Peterborough area. The first meeting was held at Sawtry Village College on 1 December 1964. The council had 21 aldermen, who were appointed at the first meeting. 11 were to serve until 1970 and 10 until 1967. Alderman Jack Hunt, who had been chairman of Soke of Peterborough County Council, was selected as the first chairman. Dennis Herbert became vice-chairman. On 30 April 1965, Peterborough City Council resolved that the name of the county council was too cumbersome and should be simplified. "West Anglia" had been discussed as an alternative.

=== County hall and offices ===
The issue of where the council should be headquartered was contentious, and the Sawtry Village College site had been agreed upon for the first meeting as it was halfway between the competing major settlements. In November 1964, Peterborough City Council resolved to offer a site for the new council at peppercorn rent. On 29 December 1964, the offer was rejected by the new county council, with the decision expected to be made following recommendations from the buildings committee. On 16 November 1965, Hinchingbrooke Park was selected as the location for the new headquarters and the county hall. The 300 acres (120 ha) site was already owned by the council and it was unanimously agreed by the buildings committee. Until a new building could be provided, administration was split between offices in the two major centres. By 1966, work on the new county hall was delayed indefinitely. On 25 April 1967, it was decided that all future council meetings would be held in Huntingdon, ending the practice of alternating with Peterborough Town Hall.

=== Coat of arms ===
In September 1964 a design prepared by the Garter King of Arms was shown to the predecessor councils. An abbot on the dexter side (the left side as viewed by an observer) denoted Peterborough and a Cromwellian soldier on the sinister side signified Huntingdon. The figures were reversed in the final design. The Soke of Peterborough motto Cor unum (one heart) was chosen over the Huntingdonshire motto of Labore omnia florent (everything flourishes through work) as it was considered more appropriate for a merger. The revised design was approved on 1 December 1964.

=== Replacement ===
The local government arrangements did not remain settled. The Redcliffe-Maud Report in 1969 recommended the abolition of the county council and the area divided, with Peterborough and Huntingdon separated as part of two new unitary authorities. Instead, a change of government policy saw the 1948 and 1960 wider amalgamation proposals revived and the council was merged with Cambridgeshire and Isle of Ely County Council to create Cambridgeshire County Council on 1 April 1974.
