= Isle of Ely =

Historic region around the city of Ely in Cambridgeshire, England

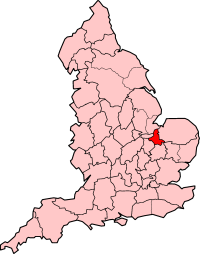
- Area
  - 1891: 239,259 acres (968.2 km^{2})
  - 1961: 239,951 acres (971.0 km^{2})
  - Coordinates: 52°24′N 0°15.5′E
- Population
  - 1891: 63,861
  - 1961: 89,180
- History
  - Origin: Liberty of Ely
  - Created: 1889
  - Abolished: 1965
  - Succeeded by: Cambridgeshire and Isle of Ely
- Status: Administrative county (within Cambridgeshire)
- Government: Isle of Ely County Council
  - HQ: County Hall, March

The Isle of Ely (/ˈiːli/) is a historic region around the city of Ely in Cambridgeshire, England. Between 1889 and 1965, it formed an administrative county.

== Toponymy ==
Its name has been said to mean "island of eels", a reference to the fish that were often caught in the local rivers for food. This etymology was first recorded by the Venerable Bede.

== History ==
1648 map by J Blaeu of Cambridgeshire with the Isle of Ely

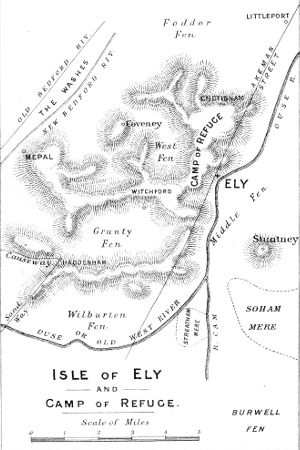
1880 map of the Isle of Ely with nearby rivers

Until the 17th century, the area was an island surrounded by a large area of fenland, a type of swamp. It was coveted as an area easy to defend, and was controlled in the very early medieval period by the Gyrwas, an Anglo-Saxon tribe. Upon their marriage in 652, Tondbert, a prince of the Gyrwas, presented Æthelthryth (who became St. Æthelthryth), the daughter of King Anna of the East Angles, with the Isle of Ely. She afterwards founded a monastery at Ely, which was destroyed by Viking raiders in 870, but was rebuilt and became a famous Abbey and Shrine.

The area's natural defences led to it playing a role in the military history of England. Following the Norman Conquest, the Isle became a refuge for Anglo-Saxon forces under Earl Morcar, Bishop Aethelwine of Durham and Hereward the Wake in 1071. The area was taken by William the Conqueror only after a prolonged struggle. The story of Tom Hickathrift is sometimes set around this period. In 1139 civil war broke out between the forces of King Stephen and the Empress Matilda. Bishop Nigel of Ely, a supporter of Matilda, unsuccessfully tried to hold the Isle. In 1143 Geoffrey de Mandeville rebelled against Stephen, and made his base in the Isle. Geoffrey was mortally wounded at Burwell in 1144.

In 1216, during the First Barons' War, the Isle was unsuccessfully defended against the army of King John. Ely took part in the Peasants' Revolt of 1381. During the English Civil War the Isle of Ely was held for the parliamentarians. Troops from the garrison at Wisbech Castle were used in the siege of Crowland and parts of the Fens were flooded to prevent Royalist forces entering Norfolk from Lincolnshire. The Horseshoe sluice on the river at Wisbech and the nearby castle and town defences were upgraded and cannon brought from Ely.

The Fens were drained beginning in 1626 using a network of canals designed by Dutch experts. Many Fenlanders were opposed to the draining as it deprived some of them of their traditional livelihood. Acts of vandalism on dykes, ditches, and sluices were common, but the draining was complete by the end of the century.

== Administration ==
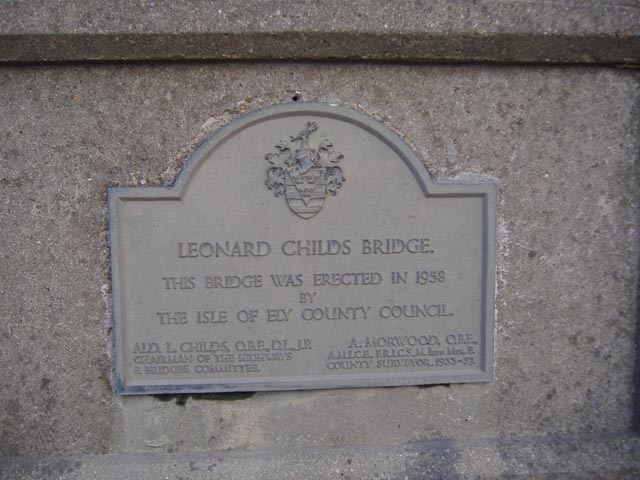
This plaque in Chatteris serves as a reminder of the Isle's county status

From 1109 until 1837, the Isle was under the jurisdiction of the Bishop of Ely who appointed a Chief Justice of Ely and exercised temporal powers within the Liberty of Ely. This temporal jurisdiction originated in a charter granted by King Edgar in 970, and confirmed by Edward the Confessor and Henry I to the abbot of Ely. The latter monarch established Ely as the seat of a bishop in 1109, creating the Isle of Ely a county palatine under the bishop. The Jurisdiction in Liberties Act 1535 (27 Hen. 8. c. 24) ended the palatine status of the Isle, with all justices of the peace to be appointed by letters patent issued under the great seal and warrants to be issued in the king's name. However, the bishop retained exclusive jurisdiction in civil and criminal matters, and was custos rotulorum. A chief bailiff was appointed for life by the bishop, and performed the functions of high sheriff within the liberty, who also headed the government of the city of Ely.

In July 1643 Oliver Cromwell was made governor of the isle.

Liberty of Ely Act 1837
- Act of Parliament
- Parliament of the United Kingdom
- Long title: An Act to explain and amend an Act of the Sixth and Seventh Years of His late Majesty, for extinguishing the Secular Jurisdiction of the Archbishop of York and the Bishop of Ely in certain Liberties in the Counties of York, Nottingham, and Cambridge.
- Citation: 7 Will. 4 & 1 Vict. c. 53
- Territorial extent: United Kingdom

Dates
- Royal assent: 15 July 1837
- Commencement: 15 July 1837 (Note: The Acts of Parliament (Commencement) Act 1793.)
- Repealed: 13 March 1975
Other legislation
Amends	Liberty of Ely Act 1837
Amended by	Statute Law Revision Act 1874; Statute Law Revision Act 1963
Repealed by	Statute Law (Repeals) Act 1975

Status: Repealed

Text of statute as originally enacted

The Liberty of Ely Act 1837 (7 Will. 4 & 1 Vict. c. 53) ended the bishop's secular powers in the Isle. The area was declared a division of Cambridgeshire, with the right to appoint justices revested in the crown. Following the 1837 act the Isle maintained separate Quarter Sessions, and formed its own constabulary.

Under the Local Government Bill of 1888, which proposed the introduction of elected county councils, the Isle was to form part of Cambridgeshire. Following the intervention of the local member of parliament, Charles Selwyn, the Isle of Ely was constituted a separate administrative county in 1889. The county was small in terms of both area and population, and its abolition was proposed by the Local Government Boundary Commission in 1947. The report of the LGBC was not acted upon, and the administrative county survived until 1965. Following the recommendations of the Local Government Commission for England, on 1 April 1965 the bulk of the area was merged to form Cambridgeshire and Isle of Ely, with the Thorney Rural District going to Huntingdon and Peterborough.

=== Subdivisions ===
In 1894 the county was divided into county districts, with the rural districts being Ely Rural District, Thorney Rural District, Whittlesey Rural District, Wisbech Rural District, North Witchford Rural District, and the urban districts were Ely, March, Whittlesey and Wisbech (the only municipal borough). Whittlesey Rural district consisted of only one parish (Whittlesey Rural), which was added to Whittlesey urban district, in 1926.

The Isle of Ely parliamentary constituency was created as a two-member seat in the First and Second Protectorate Parliaments from 1654 to 1659. The constituency was re-created with a single seat in 1918. In the boundary changes of 1983 it was replaced by the new constituency of North East Cambridgeshire. Original historical documents relating to the Isle of Ely are held by Cambridgeshire Archives and Local Studies at the County Record Office in Ely.

=== Medieval parishes ===
Chapelries are listed in italics. Parishes are listed by hundred.

Hundred	Parishes
Ely	Downham • Ely St Mary (Chettisham) • Ely Trinity (Stuntney) • Littleport
North Witchford	Chatteris • Doddington (Benwick • March) • Whittlesey St Andrew • Whittlesey St Mary (Eastrea • Eldernell)
South Witchford	Coveney (Manea) • Haddenham • Mepal • Stretham (Thetford) • Sutton • Wentworth • Wilburton • Witcham • Witchford
Wisbech	Elm • Leverington (Parson Drove) • Newton (Newton St Mary) • Thorney • Tydd St Giles • Wisbech St Peter (Guyhirn • Murrow • Wisbech St Mary)

== Marquessate ==
The title Marquess of the Isle of Ely was created in the Peerage of Great Britain for Prince Frederick. The title of Duke of Edinburgh was first created on 26 July 1726 by King George I, who bestowed it on his grandson Prince Frederick, who became Prince of Wales the following year. The subsidiary titles of the dukedom were Baron of Snowdon, in the County of Caernarvon; Viscount of Launceston, in the County of Cornwall; Earl of Eltham, in the County of Kent; and Marquess of the Isle of Ely. The marquessate was apparently erroneously gazetted as Marquess of the Isle of Wight although Marquess of the Isle of Ely was the intended title. In later editions of the London Gazette the Duke is referred to as the Marquess of the Isle of Ely. Upon Frederick's death, the titles were inherited by his son Prince George. When he became George III in 1760, the titles "merged into the Crown", and ceased to exist.

== Mining ==
Coprolites were mined in the area in the 1800s for their rich phosphate content.
