= County Buildings, Enniskillen =

County building in Enniskillen, Northern Ireland

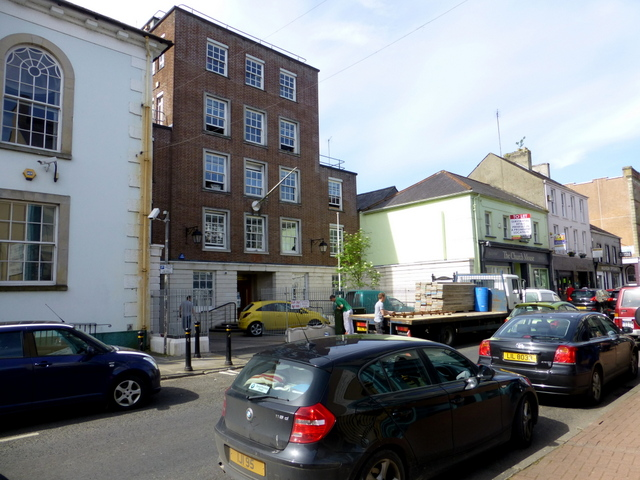
- County Buildings, Enniskillen

- Location within Northern Ireland

General information
- Architectural style: Neo-Georgian style
- Location: Enniskillen, County Fermanagh, Northern Ireland
- Coordinates: 54.3437°N 7.6366°W
- Completed: 1960

County Buildings is a municipal facility in East Bridge Street, Enniskillen, County Fermanagh, Northern Ireland. It served as the headquarters of Fermanagh County Council from 1960 to 1973.

== History ==
During the late 19th century and the first half of the 20th century, meetings of Fermanagh County Council were held at the Enniskillen Courthouse. In the 1950s, county leaders decided that the courthouse was too cramped to accommodate the county council in the context of the county council's increasing administrative responsibilities, especially while the courthouse was still acting as a facility for dispensing justice, and therefore chose to acquire additional premises on a vacant site to the west of the courthouse.

The new building, which was designed in the Neo-Georgian style, involved a symmetrical main frontage with five bays facing onto East Bridge Street; the central section of three bays, which slightly projected forwards and was five storeys high, was faced with stone and featured a deeply recessed doorway; there were sash windows on each of the floors above and a flag pole projected above the middle first floor window. The new building was constructed by the local contractor, A. J. Humphries, at a cost of £58,000 and was officially opened by the Lord Lieutenant of Fermanagh, the 5th Earl of Enniskillen, on 28 May 1960.

After the county council was abolished in 1973, the building became the regional office of several government departments. However, by the mid-1990s, although still in use by the Northern Ireland Office, the occupancy of the building had significantly reduced. It then continued to be used at a low level of occupancy by the new Northern Ireland Assembly. Following the formation of Fermanagh and Omagh District Council in April 2015, the council established a dedicated planning office in the building with the intention of making town planning services more easily accessible to local people.

In March 2017, the building was deemed surplus to requirements by the Northern Ireland Assembly and was marketed for sale. It was acquired by Fermanagh and Omagh District Council who re-designated it as a "Connect Centre" in April 2018. The council then initiated an extensive programme of refurbishment works in July 2018 before re-opening the building as a "Services Hub" and also as a Register Office for birth and deaths and as a venue for marriages and civil partnerships in February 2020.
