= 1924 Northern Ireland local elections =

- January and June 1924

All council seats

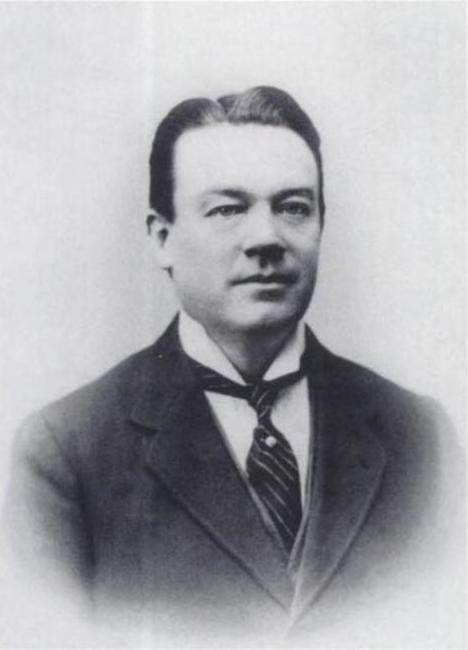
	First party	Second party
Leader	James Craig	Joseph Devlin
Party	UUP	Nationalist

The 1924 Northern Irish local elections were held in January & June 1924 for the various county & district councils of Northern Ireland. The election followed changes by the Unionist government, which had redrawn electoral districts, abolished PR for local elections, and implemented a requirement for members of local authorities to take an oath of allegiance.

These changes are now widely considered by historians as gerrymandering intended to manipulate the election outcome in favour of the Ulster Unionists. As a result unionists won the majority of seats in several nationalist areas and most nationalists' victories from the 1920 Irish local elections were overturned.

== Background ==
The elections were the first local elections to be held in Northern Ireland, which had been created by the Government of Ireland Act 1920. Northern Ireland's county and district councils had last been elected in the all-Ireland 1920 Irish local elections using the single transferable vote (STV) voting system, which had been introduced in the hopes of preventing Sinn Féin from winning the same kind of landslide that the FPTP ward system had allowed it in the 1918 general election.

Whilst Unionists in Southern Ireland had supported the introduction of STV for local elections, the Ulster Unionists had opposed it, with the Ulster Unionist leader James Craig favouring retention of the FPTP ward system used in the rest of Britain, and the UUP was committed to returning to the old system. In contrast, Nationalists favoured the retention of a proportional representation based system as a safeguard for minorities.

The Northern Irish parliament, dominated by the UUP who held 75% of the seats following the 1921 election, legislated for a return to FPTP in the Local Government Act (Northern Ireland) 1922, and also legislated for the redrawing of electoral divisions.

== Results ==
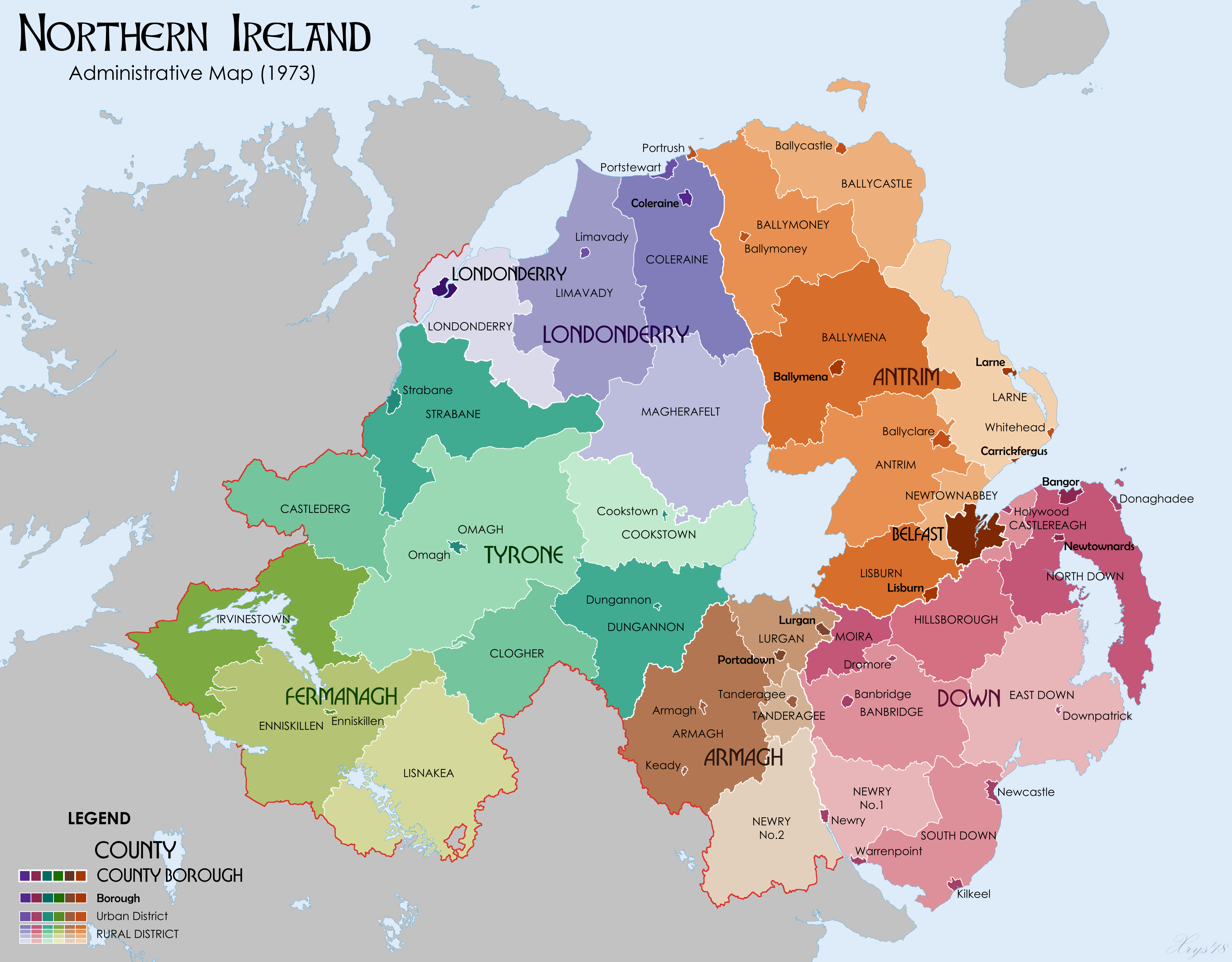
Map of the Rural and Urban Districts of Northern Ireland

As a result of the nationalist boycott Unionists regained control of the county councils for Fermanagh and Tyrone, with no contests taking place in either county.

Unionists also retook 8 rural district councils:

- Cookstown
- Dungannon
- Kilkeel
- Lisnaskea
- Newry No. 1
- Newry No. 2
- Omagh
- Strabane

In Belfast Unionists focused their campaigning on the wards most at risk of falling to the new Northern Irish Labour Party.

Overall the results saw large defeats for Nationalists, Sinn Féin, and Labour candidates. After 1920 these parties had together controlled 24 of the 75 local authorities in Northern Ireland; by 1927 they controlled 12.

=== Detailed results by council type ===
==== County councils ====
Results by county council.

Authority	UUP	SF	Nat	NILP	Ind	Total	Result	Details
Antrim							UUP	Details
Armagh							UUP	Details
Down							UUP	Details
Fermanagh	All	0	0	0	0		UUP	Details
Londonderry							UUP	Details
Tyrone	All	0	0	0	0		UUP	Details
Totals								

==== County Borough councils ====
Authority	UUP	SF	Nat	NILP	Ind	Total	Result	Details
Belfast	12	0	0	2	1		UUP	Details
Derry							No overall control	Details

==== District councils ====
Authority	UUP	SF	Nat	NILP	Ind	Total	Result	Details
Armagh								Details
Banbridge No.1								Details
Banbridge No.2								Details
Castleblayney No.2								Details
Lurgan No.1								Details
Lurgan No.2								Details
Newry No.1							UUP	Details
Newry No.2							UUP	Details
