= County Hall, Ballymena =

County building in Ballymena, Northern Ireland

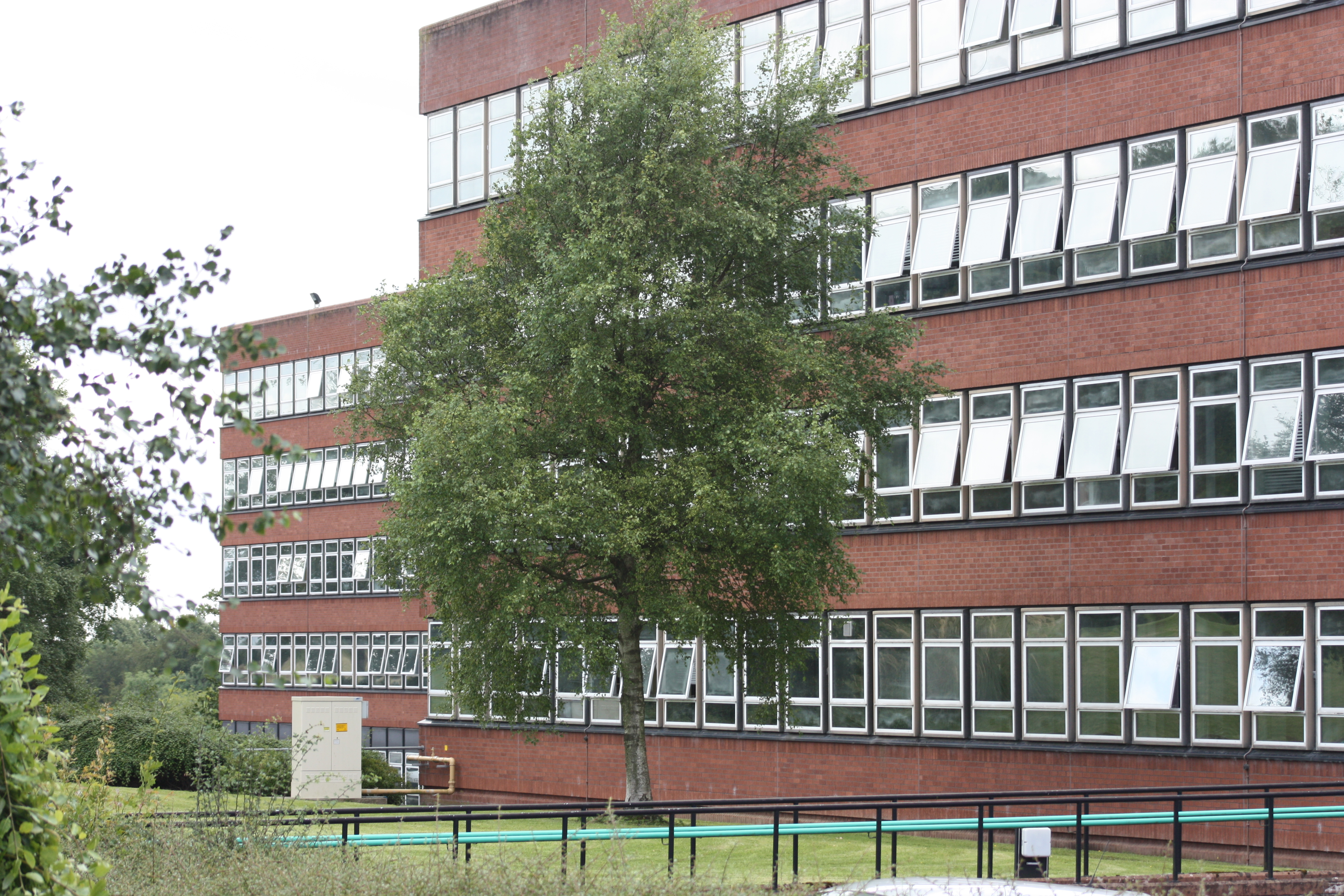
- County Hall, Ballymena

- Location within Northern Ireland

General information
- Architectural style: Modern style
- Location: Ballymena, County Antrim, Northern Ireland
- Coordinates: 54.8560°N 6.3097°W
- Completed: 1970

Design and construction
- Architects: Burman Goodall & Partners

County Hall is a municipal facility at Galgorm Road in Ballymena, County Antrim, Northern Ireland. It served as the headquarters of Antrim County Council from 1970 to 1973.

== History ==
During the late 19th century and the first half of the 20th century, meetings of Antrim County Council were held at the Crumlin Road Courthouse. In the 1960s, county leaders decided that the courthouse was too cramped to accommodate the county council in the context of the county council's increasing administrative responsibilities, especially while the courthouse was still acting as a facility for dispensing justice, and therefore chose to acquire additional premises on a site in the north east corner of the Galgorm Castle estate.

The new building, which was designed by Burman Goodall & Partners in the modern style, was completed in 1970. The design for the five-storey building involved continuous bands of glazing with red brick above and below; the main assembly hall in the building was named as the Chichester Hall. It was called after Lieutenant Colonel Arthur Chichester, who was Clerk of the Parliaments for Northern Ireland and lived at Galgorm Castle until his death in 1972.

The building was badly damaged in a car bomb attack by the Provisional IRA on 7 October 1972.

After the county council was abolished in 1973, the building became the regional office of several government departments, including the Northern Health and Social Services Board from 1974 to 1987 and, since then, the Northern Offices of the Health and Social Care Board and the Public Health Agency. Approximately 160 civil servants were still employed by the Northern Ireland Assembly in the building as at 1 January 2014. Concerns were expressed by a Member of the Legislative Assembly in December 2015 about the long-term economic viability of the building following announcements about the departure of both the Car Tax office and also the Education Authority from the building.
