= Walden House =

Municipal building in Huntingdon, England

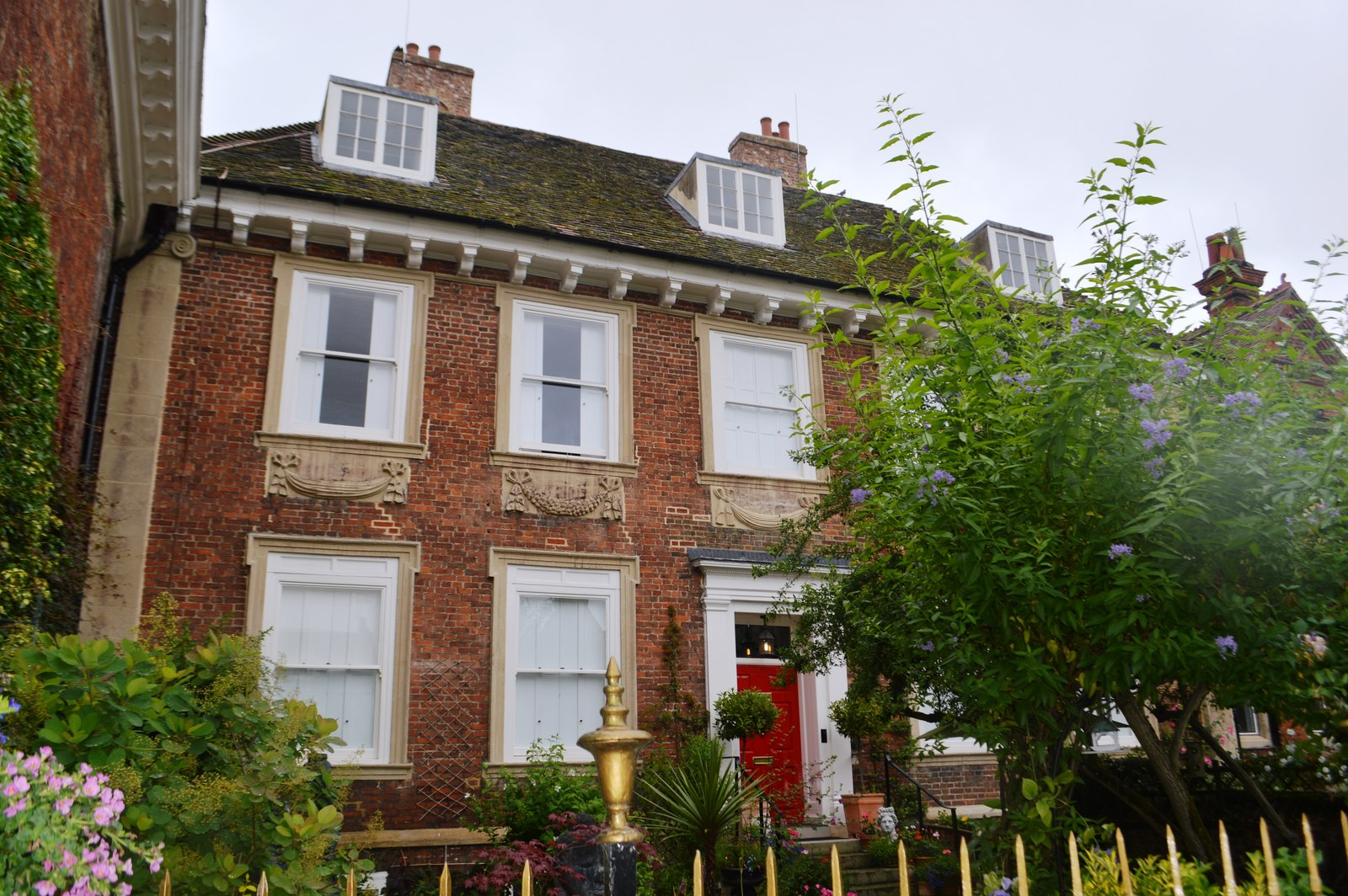
- Walden House

- Shown in Cambridgeshire
- 52.3303°N 0.1838°W
- Location: Market Hill, Huntingdon

History
- Built: 1674

Site notes
- Architectural style: Jacobean style

Listed Building – Grade II*
- Official name: Walden House, Market Hill
- Designated: 10 January 1951
- Reference no.: 1128590

Walden House is a former municipal structure in Market Hill, Huntingdon, Cambridgeshire, England. The structure, which has formerly the headquarters of Huntingdonshire County Council and has since been converted into private apartments, is a Grade II* listed building.

== History ==
The building was commissioned by the local member of parliament, Lionel Walden I, in the 1660s. It was designed in the Jacobean style, built in red brick with stone dressings and was completed in 1674. The design involved a symmetrical main frontage of five bays facing the High Street. The central bay contained a doorway with a rectangular fanlight flanked by Doric order pilasters supporting an entablature. The other bays on the ground floor and all the bays on the first floor were fenestrated by sash windows with architraves; below the windows on the first floor there were stone panels carved with swags. There were full height Ionic order pilasters at either end and, at roof level, there was a modillioned cornice and three dormer windows.

Walden hosted a visit by the Duke of York, and was one of his strongest supporters after the duke became King James II in 1685. The house passed to his son, Lionel Walden II, and then to his grandson, Lionel Walden III; the grandson was a supporter of James Francis Edward Stuart and, after the Jacobite rising of 1715, the grandson fled to France where he died. In the late 19th century, the building was acquired by a banker, Henry Charles Geldart.

After Geldart's death in 1912, the house was vacant for two years. In July 1914, at the start of the First World War, it was requisitioned by the War Office for use an officers' mess for the 1st Highland Brigade of the Royal Field Artillery, who were billeted locally. In December 1914, it was re-assigned as a military hospital managed by a Voluntary Aid Detachment. After the war it was decommissioned and became the main offices of Huntingdonshire County Council, with all the key officers including the county surveyor, county accountant and county medical officer all based there. It also served as the main offices of Huntingdon and Peterborough County Council from April 1965 until that county was absorbed by Cambridgeshire County Council in 1974.

The building continued to be occupied by staff from Cambridgeshire County Council until 2004, when it was acquired by a developer. It was then refurbished to a design by Haymills Conservation and converted into six private apartments with the first flat being ready for occupation in November 2008.

== See also ==
- Grade II* listed buildings in Huntingdonshire
