= Tyne and Wear County Council =

Former metropolitan county council in north east England

History
- Founded: 1 April 1974
- Disbanded: 31 March 1986
- Succeeded by: Gateshead Council; Newcastle City Council; North Tyneside Council; South Tyneside Council; Sunderland City Council

Elections
- Last election: 1981

Meeting place
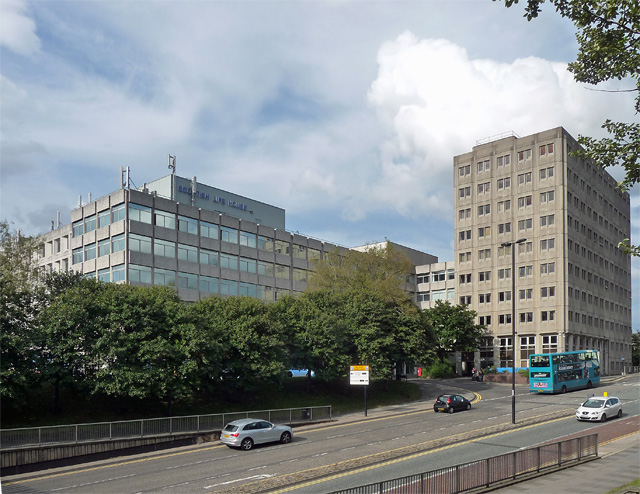
- Sandyford House, Newcastle upon Tyne

Tyne and Wear County Council was the county council of the metropolitan county of Tyne and Wear in north-east England from 1974 to 1986. The council was based at Sandyford House in Newcastle upon Tyne. It provided certain county-level functions across the area, notably including public transport and strategic town planning. District-level functions were provided by Tyne and Wear's five metropolitan borough councils. On the county council's abolition in 1986, county-level functions were taken over by the five metropolitan borough councils, with some services provided through joint committees.

== History ==
The council came into its powers on 1 April 1974. The county council was based at Sandyford House in Newcastle upon Tyne. The council was abolished in 1986; from 1 April 1986 the former county council's functions passed to the county's five existing metropolitan borough councils: Gateshead Council, Newcastle City Council, North Tyneside Council, South Tyneside Council and Sunderland City Council.

== Political control ==
The first election to the council was held in 1973, initially operating as a shadow authority before coming into its powers on 1 April 1974. Throughout the council's existence from 1974 to 1986, Labour held a majority of the seats on the council.

Party in control	Years
Labour	1974–1986

=== Leadership ===
Throughout the council's existence the leader of the council was Michael Campbell.

Councillor	Party	From	To
Michael Campbell	Labour	1 Apr 1974	31 Mar 1986

== Council elections ==
- 1973 Tyne and Wear County Council election
- 1977 Tyne and Wear County Council election
- 1981 Tyne and Wear County Council election
