= Isle of Ely County Council =

Former county council in England

History
- Founded: 1 April 1889
- Disbanded: 1 April 1965
- Succeeded by: Cambridgeshire and Isle of Ely County Council

Meeting place
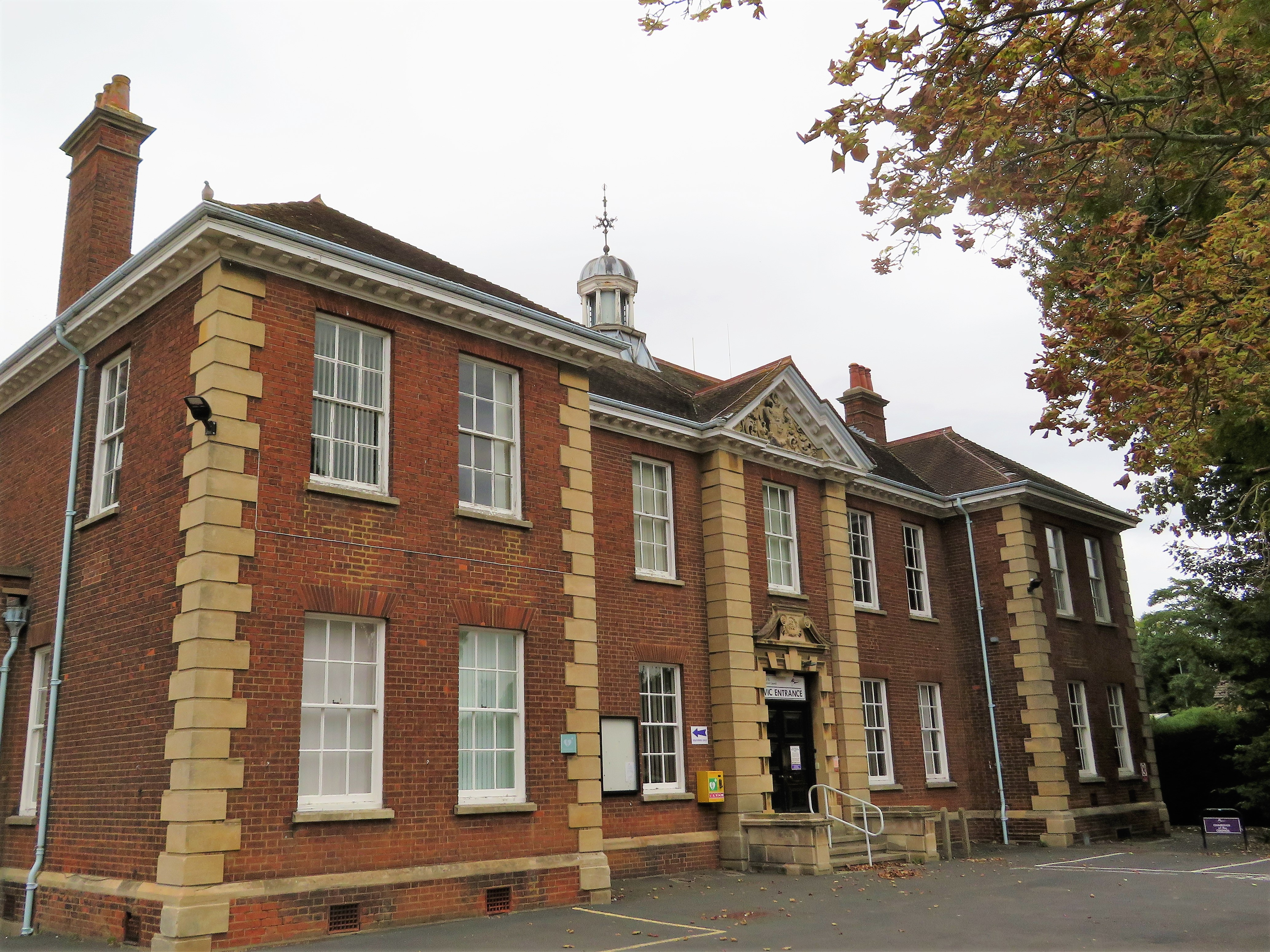
- County Hall, March

Isle of Ely County Council was the county council of the Isle of Ely in the east of England. It came into its powers on 1 April 1889 and was abolished on 1 April 1965. The county council was based at County Hall, March. It was amalgamated with Cambridgeshire County Council to form the new Cambridgeshire and Isle of Ely County Council in 1965.

The Isle of Ely County Council was granted a coat of arms on 1 May 1931. Previous to the grant the council had been using the arms of Diocese of Ely: Gules, three ducal coronets, two and one or. In the 1931 grant, silver and blue waves were added to the episcopal arms, to suggest that the county was an "isle". The crest above the shield was a human hand grasping a trident around which an eel was entwined, referring to the popular derivation of "Ely". On the wrist of the hand was a "Wake knot", representing Hereward the Wake.
