= Huntingdonshire County Council =

History
- Founded: 1 April 1889
- Disbanded: 1 April 1965
- Succeeded by: Huntingdon and Peterborough County Council

Meeting place
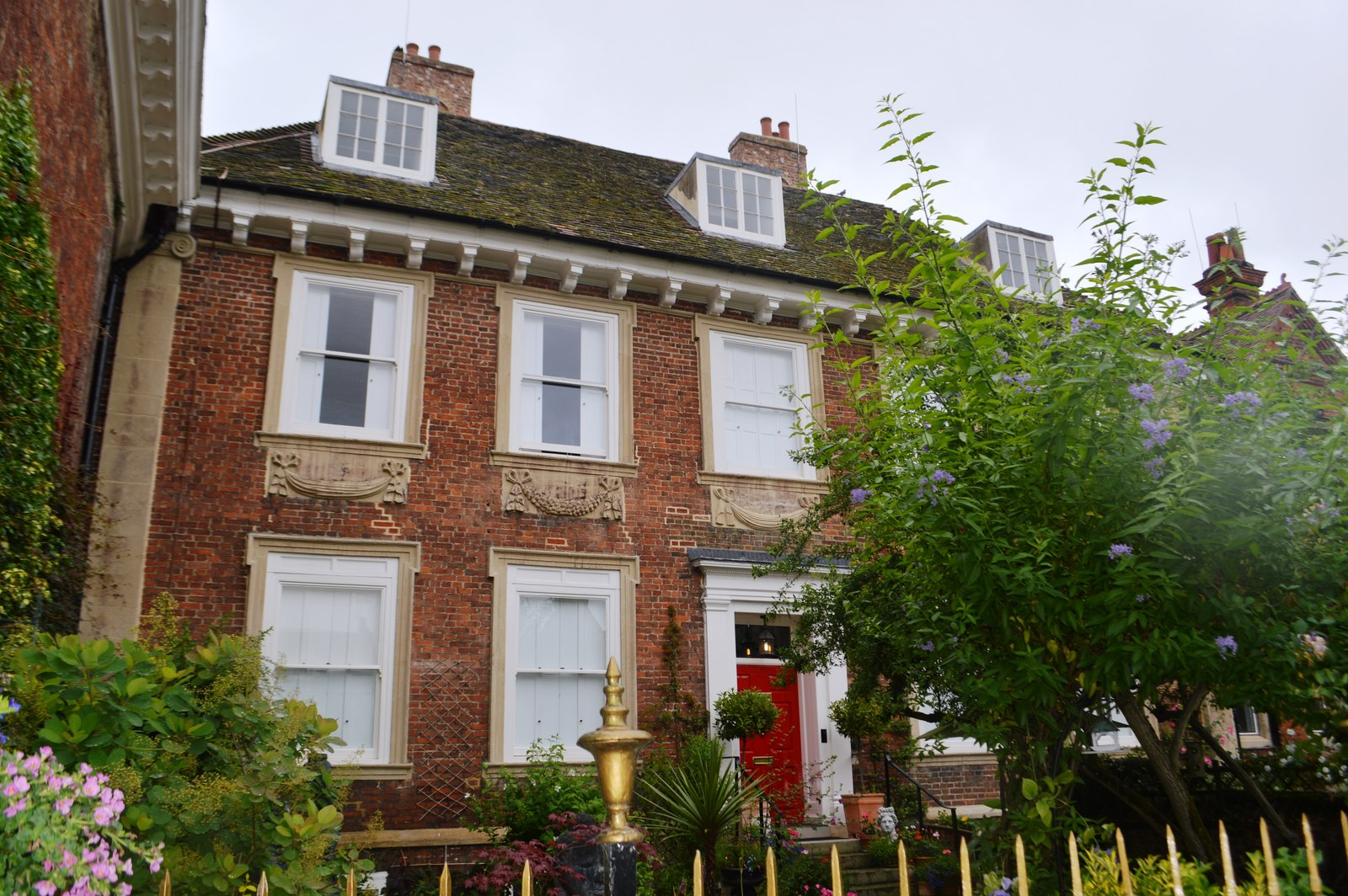
- Walden House, Huntingdon

Huntingdonshire County Council was the county council of Huntingdonshire in the east of England. It came into its powers on 1 April 1889 and was abolished on 1 April 1965. It was amalgamated with Soke of Peterborough County Council to form Huntingdon and Peterborough County Council in 1965.

== Premises ==
Council meetings were held at Huntingdon Town Hall, which was also known as the Shire Hall. The council's staff were based at a variety of premises, including several converted old houses on the west side of Market Hill in Huntingdon, including Walden House, Wycombe (or Wykenham) House, and Gazeley House. In 1945 the council also converted the old Huntingdon Grammar School buildings on Grammar School Walk to be additional offices, renaming it the County Buildings. Planning permission was granted for a purpose-built county hall on the old grammar school playing fields in 1957, but the scheme was not pursued.
