= Cambridgeshire and Isle of Ely County Council =

- Coat of arms adopted in September 1965

Type
- Type: County council
- Houses: Unicameral

History
- Founded: 1 April 1965
- Disbanded: 1 April 1974
- Preceded by: Cambridgeshire County Council; Isle of Ely County Council
- Succeeded by: Cambridgeshire County Council
- Seats: 70 councillors; 23 aldermen

Elections
- Councillors voting system: First-past-the-post
- Aldermen voting system: Indirect election
- First Councillors election: 22 September 1964
- First Aldermen election: 5 October 1964
- Last Councillors election: 7 April 1970
- Last Aldermen election: 2 May 1970

Motto
- Sapientes simus (Latin) transl. Let us be men of understanding

Meeting place
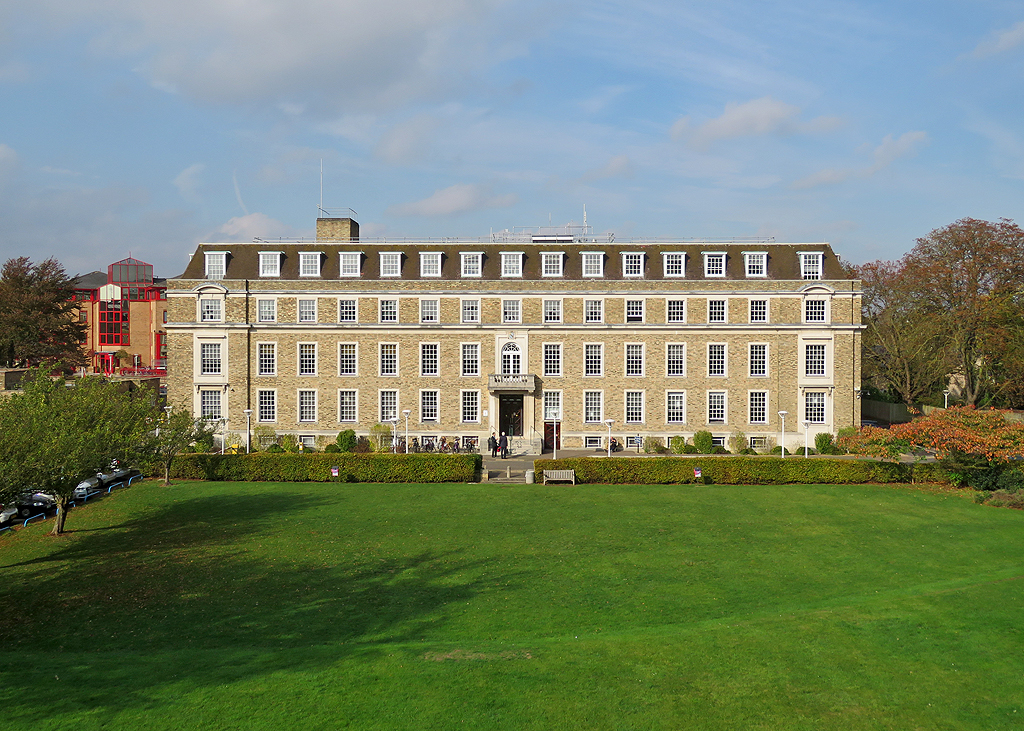
- Shire Hall, Cambridge

Cambridgeshire and Isle of Ely County Council was the short-lived county council of Cambridgeshire and Isle of Ely in the east of England. The amalgamation of county councils covering small counties in the region was anticipated for many years prior to its creation. The merger was finally approved in March 1964 and elections to the new authority took place on 22 September 1964. The new council formally took over on 1 April 1965 when the predecessor Cambridgeshire County Council and Isle of Ely County Council were abolished. Things did not remain settled and the council was proposed to be abolished in 1969. It was merged with Huntingdon and Peterborough County Council to form a new larger Cambridgeshire County Council, on 1 April 1974.

== History ==
=== Background ===
There was a proposal in 1911 to merge the county councils of the Isle of Ely and Cambridgeshire, although it met with some resistance. In January 1945, the UK government published a white paper about the future of local government. The Local Government Boundary Commission was set up in October 1945 and published its first report on 22 April 1947. The commission found that the Soke of Peterborough, Huntingdonshire and the Isle of Ely were too small for effective administration. A variety of conflicting proposals for amalgamations were received by the commission. On 8 April 1948, the commission recommended the amalgamation of Cambridgeshire, the Isle of Ely, Huntingdonshire and the Soke of Peterborough into a single county. These proposals did not proceed and the work of the commission was wound up in 1949.

The idea of amalgamation returned in 1960 when the Local Government Commission for England published their draft proposals for the area. Cambridgeshire, Huntingdonshire, the Isle of Ely and the Soke of Peterborough would be combined as a single county. The proposals were not well received. In 1961 the final proposals were published. Cambridgeshire and the Isle of Ely would merge to form a new county. The creation of the county and county council on 1 April 1965 was approved by the UK Government in March 1964. Provision was made for elections to the new authority to take place ahead of the merger in order to give time to prepare.

=== Creation of the council ===
A joint working committee of the predecessor authorities was set up in 1964. In May 1964, Keith Joseph, the Minister of Housing and Local Government, suggested the name of the new authority should be shortened to 'Cambridgeshire and Ely'. This was rejected by the working committee, as had been the earlier suggestion of 'Cambridgeshire'. The first election of 70 councillors to the new authority took place on 22 September 1964. 21 were elected from the Cambridge city area, 25 from the rest of Cambridgeshire and 24 from the Isle of Ely area. The first meeting was held on 5 October 1964. The council had 23 aldermen, who were appointed at the first meeting.

=== County hall and offices ===
The decision about where the new council would be headquartered was deferred by the joint committee until after the first election of councillors.

=== Coat of arms ===
In 1964, the joint committee asked the College of Arms to prepare a coat of arms for the new council that combined only the most significant features of the predecessors. The design was shown to the joint committee in March 1964 and they recommended it for approval. There was a delay in approving the coat of arms because of a dispute over how the great bustard birds should be depicted, with folded wings or extended. The coat of arms was granted to the council in September 1965:

Coat of arms of Cambridgeshire and Isle of Ely County
Granted 1 September 1965 Coronet Mural crown Or Escutcheon Or a double Tressure flory counterflory Gules over all on a Bend wavy Azure three [open] Crowns Or Supporters On either side a Great Bustard proper the exterior leg resting on a closed Book Gules garnished Or. Motto 'SAPIENTES SIMUS' - Let us be men of understanding Symbolism The wavy blue band across the shield refers to the River Cam, which apart from being a geographical feature was for long important as a trade route and a source of prosperity. The three golden crowns are from the of arms of the Isle of Ely CC. Forming a border on the shield are double lines set with fleurs-de-lis; this is derived from the Royal Arms of Scotland because the Earldom of the shire was held by Kings of Scotland in the twelfth century. Above the shield is a mural crown, a common symbol of civic government. The two supporting birds are great bustards, which were made extinct in Britain in the 19th century. It is claimed that this county formed their last English habitat; Wiltshire also claims the last associations with these birds and shows one as the crest of its Arms. Each bird stands on a book as an allusion to the University of Cambridge. The motto applies both to the community attitude of the area and to the significance of the part played by education throughout it.

=== Replacement ===
The local government arrangements did not remain settled. The Redcliffe-Maud Report in 1969 recommended the abolition of the county council, and the area divided between two unitary authorities. Instead, a change of government policy saw the 1948 and 1960 wider amalgamation proposals revived and the council was merged with Huntingdon and Peterborough County Council to create Cambridgeshire County Council on 1 April 1974.
