= Fermanagh County Council =

Local authority, 1899 to 1973

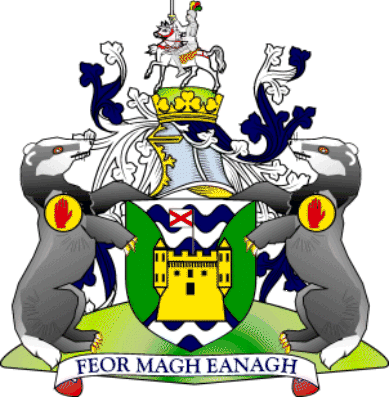
- Armorial of County Fermanagh

History
- Founded: 1 April 1899
- Disbanded: 1 October 1973
- Succeeded by: Fermanagh District Council

Meeting place
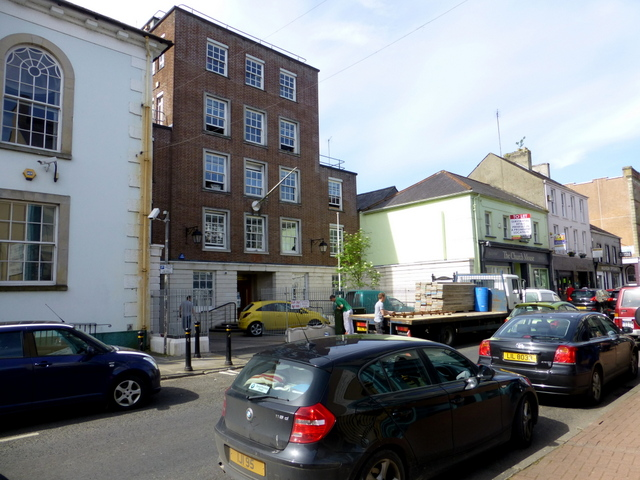
- County Buildings, Enniskillen

Fermanagh County Council was the authority responsible for local government in County Fermanagh, Northern Ireland, between 1899 and 1973. It was originally based at the Enniskillen Courthouse, but moved to County Buildings in East Bridge Street, Enniskillen, in 1960.

== History ==
Fermanagh County Council was established on 1 April 1899 under orders issued in accordance with the Local Government (Ireland) Act 1898 for the administrative county of County Fermanagh, which succeeded the former judicial county of Fermanagh.

The Local Government (Ireland) Act 1919 introduced proportional representation by means of the single transferable vote (PR-STV) for the 1920 Irish local elections. In 1921, shortly before the partition of Ireland and transfer of power from the Dublin Castle administration to the Government of Northern Ireland, Fermanagh County Council passed a resolution on a 13–10 majority not to recognise the newly formed Parliament of Northern Ireland and pledged their allegiance to Dáil Éireann of the self-proclaimed Irish Republic. The resolution stated: "We, the County Council of Fermanagh, in view of the expressed desire of a large majority of people in this county, do not recognise the partition parliament in Belfast and do hereby direct our Secretary to hold no further communications with either Belfast or British Local Government Departments, and we pledge our allegiance to Dáil Éireann". In response, the Royal Irish Constabulary evicted them from their council offices and confiscated official documents. As a result, the council was temporarily dissolved. The council were replaced by Commissioners appointed by Sir Dawson Bates, Minister of Home Affairs in the new government.

PR-STV was abolished in Northern Ireland under the Local Government Act 1922, with a reversion to first-past-the-post for the 1924 Northern Ireland local elections, the first local elections held in the new jurisdiction. The council was reformed by the time of the 1924 local elections. As a protest against the abolition of proportional representation, nationalist parties boycotted the election, allowing unionist parties to take control of the council uncontested. Due to the abolition of proportional representation and gerrymandering, the council always had a unionist majority of councillors elected up until abolition. On 1 April 1967, by order of William Fitzsimmons, the Minister of Development, Fermanagh County Council was amalgamated with the smaller Enniskillen Borough Council and the rural district councils in Enniskillen, Irvinestown and Lisnaskea to turn Fermanagh County Council into a unitary authority.

== Later years and abolition ==
In 1969, the Fermanagh Civil Rights Association published a booklet criticising the council and accusing them of favouring the Protestant community over the Catholic community. Some of the accusations included that the council would deliberately hire Protestants for skilled local government and school jobs and that they proposed to build a new village for Catholics in a gerrymandered district that already had a Catholic majority. The council was abolished in accordance with the Local Government Act (Northern Ireland) 1972 on 1 October 1973 and replaced by Fermanagh District Council.
