= Local government in Dublin =

Local government in Dublin, the capital city of Ireland, is currently administered through the local authorities of four local government areas (the city of Dublin and the counties of Dún Laoghaire–Rathdown, Fingal and South Dublin). The historical development of these councils dates back to medieval times.

== Poor laws ==
Under the Poor Relief (Ireland) Act 1838, counties were divided into poor law unions, which were in turn composed of poor law electoral division.

== Municipal Corporations (Ireland) Act 1840 ==
The Municipal Corporations (Ireland) Act 1840 reduced the number of boroughs in Ireland and reformed the governance of those that remained. Dublin was one of ten boroughs to retain a corporation.

The assembly of Dublin Corporation was Dublin City Council of sixty members. The city was divided into fifteen wards, each ward to have one alderman and three councillors. The wards were revised by order under the Dublin Corporation Act 1849 (12 & 13 Vict. c. 85), and by further act, the Corporation of Dublin Act 1850 (13 & 14 Vict. c. 50), were designated to correspond to former wards for the purpose of designating aldermen.

1840 Act	1849 Act
Custom House Ward	North Dock Ward
Post Office Ward	North City Ward
St. Paul's Ward	Arran Quay Ward
Four Courts Ward	Inn's Quay Ward
Linen Hall Ward	Rotunda Ward
St. George's Ward	Mountjoy Ward
St. James's Ward	Usher's Quay Ward
St. Catherine's Ward	Merchant's Quay Ward
St. Andrew's Ward	Wood Quay Ward
St. Audeon's Ward	South City Ward
Merrion Ward	South Dock Ward
College Ward	Trinity Ward
Castle Ward	Royal Exchange Ward
St. Stephen's Ward	Mansion House Ward
St. Patrick's Ward	Fitzwilliam Ward

== Townships ==
Urban areas in county Dublin formed townships governed by town commissioners over the course of the nineteenth century, either under the Towns Improvement (Ireland) Act 1854 or by local acts:

- Balbriggan
- Blackrock (1863)
- Clontarf (1869)
- Dalkey
- Drumcondra, Clonliffe and Glasnevin (1878)
- Killiney and Ballybrack
- Kingstown
- New Kilmainham
- Pembroke (1863)
- Rathmines (1847); later expanded as Rathmines and Rathgar (1862)

== Local Government (Ireland) Act 1898 ==
The Local Government (Ireland) Act 1898 reformed local government throughout the country, with first-tier division between administrative counties and county boroughs, and a second-tier division of administrative counties into urban areas and rural areas. The poor law electoral divisions within counties were renamed as district electoral divisions.

The city of Dublin continued as a county borough. Each of the townships in the administrative county of Dublin, with the exception of Balbriggan, became an urban district. The rural areas were Balrothery, Celbridge No. 2, North Dublin, Rathdown, and South Dublin.

== 1900: Expansion of city ==
In reorganisation shortly after the implementation of the 1898 Act, the urban districts of Clontarf, of Drumcondra, Clonliffe and Glasnevin, and of New Kilmainham were incorporated into the city. The added area became the wards of Clontarf East, Clontarf West, Drumcondra, Glasnevin, and New Kilmainham, each elected one alderman and three councillors (with a further portion added to the South Dock Ward). This was an expansion of the number of members of the City Council from sixty to eighty. An election was held for the new wards in January 1901.

== Establishment of Howth ==
Howth became an urban district in 1919, having formerly been within the rural district of North Dublin.

== Local Government (Ireland) Act 1919 ==
The Local Government (Ireland) Act 1919 introduced the system of proportional representation by means of the single transferable vote to Irish local elections. This ended the use of wards in the city and district electoral divisions in the county as electoral areas. However, they continued to be used and defined as fundamental geographical units, both to define the borough electoral areas and county electoral areas, and as census tracts.

Starting in 1920, Dublin Corporation used ten "Borough Electoral Areas" with DM ranging from 6 to 10, to elect its 80 members.

== Local Government (Dublin) Act 1930 ==
The administration of both the city and the county of Dublin was altered by the Local Government (Dublin) Act 1930:

- the abolition of the urban districts of Pembroke and Rathmines and Rathgar and their inclusion within the city limits;
- the abolition of urban districts of Dún Laoghaire, Blackrock, Dalkey, Killiney and Ballybrack, and the creation as their successor of the borough of Dún Laoghaire;
- the transfer, from 1 April 1931, of territory from the county to the city, termed the "added rural areas", including Drumcondra, Glasnevin, Donnybrook and Terenure;
- the abolition of rural districts in County Dublin (which had been abolished elsewhere under the Local Government Act 1925;
- the reduction of Dublin City Council from 80 members to 35 members, 5 of which were to be elected by a register of commercial electors.

The register of commercial electors was provided by separate legislation. These five seats were abolished in 1935 and redistributed as geographical seats.

== 1940s: Expansion of city ==
In 1942, Howth was transferred from the county to the city.

In 1945, the city council was increased from 35 to 45 members.

== 1985: Organisation into electoral counties ==
Under Local Government (Reorganisation) Act 1985, territory was transferred from the county to the city (including Santry and Phoenix Park), and from the city to the county (including Howth, Sutton and parts of Kilbarrack including Bayside).

Dublin City Council was increased from 45 to 52 members.

County Dublin was divided into three electoral counties, each with its own council: Dublin–Fingal (24 members), Dublin–Belgard (26 members), and Dún Laoghaire–Rathdown (28 members). Elections were to be administered through these electoral counties, rather than to the County Council or the Borough Council of Dún Laoghaire. At the 1985 election, the County Council would consist of 78 members, being the total number of members from the three electoral counties. This was an increase from 36 at the 1979 election. Areas of Dún Laoghaire–Rathdown were to be designated as relevant electoral areas, whose members would also sit as members of Corporation of Dún Laoghaire.

At the 1991 local election, the electoral counties of Dublin–Belgard and Dublin–Fingal were renamed as South Dublin and Fingal respectively.

== 1994: Division of County Dublin ==
Under the Local Government (Dublin) Act 1993, County Dublin and the borough of Dún Laoghaire were abolished. The county was succeeded by the three new counties of Dún Laoghaire–Rathdown, Fingal, and South Dublin, corresponding, with minor boundary changes, with the electoral counties. This took effect on 1 January 1994.

== 21st century ==
The Local Government Act 2001, which came into effect in 2002, altered the nomenclature of local government areas throughout the state. The county boroughs were renamed as cities, while administrative counties were to be described simply as counties. Dublin Corporation became Dublin City Council, previously the name for the assembly alone. The town commissioners of Balbriggan became a town council.

Under the Local Government Reform Act 2014, local government in Ireland was reduced to a single tier. In Dublin, that meant the abolition of Balbriggan Town Council. There was an adjustment to the number of seats for each local authority, which saw an increase for all four of the Dublin authorities. Dublin City Council was increased to 63, while the councils of each of Dún Laoghaire–Rathdown, Fingal, and South Dublin were each increased to 40.

The 2014 Act allowed for a plebiscite to be held to on whether there should be a directly elected mayor for Dublin city and county. However, it required the approval of the councils of the counties and the city. It was rejected by Fingal County Council, but supported by each of the three other Dublin councils.

== Regional administration ==
Eight Regional Authorities were established in Ireland in 1994. This included the Dublin Regional Authority, and comprised 14 representatives of the corporation of the county borough of Dublin, and five each from the councils of the administrative counties of Dún Laoghaire–Rathdown, Fingal and South Dublin.

In 2014, the regional authorities were abolished, and their administration transferred to Regional Assemblies. From 1 January 2015, these councils were part of the Eastern and Midland Regional Assembly; this included 7 representatives of the council of the city of Dublin, and three each from the councils of the counties of Dún Laoghaire–Rathdown, Fingal and South Dublin (as well as other counties in the region). These four form the Dublin strategic planning area within the region.

== Proposed reform ==
There was a Dublin citizens assembly in 2022 to consider reform of local government, including a directly elected mayor.

== Definitions of wards and DEDs ==
Under the Electoral Act 1963, the Minister for Local Government had the authority to divide a county borough into wards and a county into district electoral districts, with previous divisions remaining in place prior to the first such order. Wards and DEDs were used to define components of electoral geography (local electoral areas and Dáil constituencies) and as census tracts. From 1996, they were both renamed as electoral divisions.

=== Definitions of wards ===
- 15 April 1971: Revised wards in the county borough of Dublin
- 12 April 1986: Revised wards in the county borough of Dublin
  - 29 April 1994: Amendments to wards to account for alterations to county boundary
  - 15 February 1997: Cherry Orchard B renamed as Carna

=== Definitions of district electoral divisions ===
- 15 April 1971: Revised district electoral divisions in the County Dublin
- 12 April 1986: Revised district electoral divisions in the County Dublin
  - 24 March 1986: minor correction
  - 29 April 1994: amendment following establishment of new counties

== References, citations and sources ==
=== Further reading ===
- Dudley Edwards, R. (March 1938). "The Beginnings of Municipal Government in Dublin". Dublin Historical Record. 1 (1). Old Dublin Society: 2–10. JSTOR 30080028.
- O'Connor, Tom (Autumn 1993). "Reform of Local Government". Studies: An Irish Quarterly Review. 82 (327). Messenger Publications: 323–332. JSTOR 30091010.

=== External links ===
- Dublin Historic Maps, Boundaries & an OSM Miscellany
