= Chief executive (Irish local government) =

City or county managers

The Chief Executive of a city or county is the senior permanent official in local government in the Republic of Ireland. Whereas the county council and city council are elected officials who formulate policy, the chief executive is an appointed official who manages the implementation of policy. The position was introduced in 1929–42 based on the American council–manager government model, and until 2014 the chief executive was styled the county manager or city manager. Their salaries range from €132,511 to €189,301 per annum. The County and City Management Association (formerly the County and City Managers' Association) is the professional association for chief executives, and it is affiliated to the International City/County Management Association (ICMA).

== History ==
The Local Government (Ireland) Act 1898 established elected county and town councils with executive authority, with the Local Government Board for Ireland having the power to dissolve councils which did not comply with their statutory obligations. After the Irish Free State was established in 1922, the Local Government Board's functions were taken by the Minister for Local Government. During and immediately after the Irish Civil War, the Minister dissolved several councils, including those of Dublin and Cork cities, and replaced each with an unelected commissioner. In both cities, there was a body of opinion that the services provided by the councils were delivered more efficiently and fairly under the commissioners than under the previous system, where the executive function had been, in effect, vested in the councils and their committees.

In 1926, a committee of commercial and industrial interests in Cork came together to consider a scheme of city government. Having regard to the city's experience of commissioners and recent experience in the United States, a council–manager government was proposed. After discussion between the minister for local government and local representatives, the minister, Richard Mulcahy, introduced a government measure, which was enacted as the Cork City Management Act 1929, despite opposition. The first Cork city manager, Philip Monahan, had previously been the commissioner who replaced Cork Corporation and before that Kerry County Council. The minister proposed and the Oireachtas enacted similar provision for Dublin in 1930. Similar laws were passed under the next, Fianna Fáil, government for the other two county boroughs: Limerick in 1934 and Waterford in 1939. The previous office of town clerk was superseded by the new manager, except in Cork where it remained separate until 1941. The County (Management) Act 1940, which was commenced in August 1942, extended the manager system from the urban county boroughs to the rural administrative counties. The system was modified also in subsequent legislation, particularly the City and County Management (Amendment) Act 1955, which made some adjustments to give greater power to the council members.

Under the 1940 act, a county manager was the manager of every borough or municipal town in that county, but from the 1990s had the power to delegate these functions to any other officer of that borough or town council. The Borough of Dún Laoghaire, with nearly the level of autonomy as a county borough, had a borough manager from its 1930 creation. Initially, six pairs of smaller counties shared a manager; the last such case was Laois and Offaly, split in 1982. On several occasions, the Minister for the Environment has suspended a fractious elected council, leaving the manager to run its affairs until the next local elections. The split of Galway city from County Galway in 1985, and of County Dublin into three counties in 1993 saw separate managers appointed. A 2010 report commissioned by the Government suggested reducing the number of county managers from 34 to 24. The mergers of three pairs of local government areas in 2014 were preceded by the appointment of joint managers from 2012.

Under the Local Government Reform Act 2014, the position of "County/City Manager" was replaced by that of "Chief Executive". Existing managers became the initial chief executives, with local authorities gaining the power to veto subsequent appointments and to remove a chief executive for "stated misbehaviour".

Following the establishment of a directly elected mayor for Limerick City and County, under the provisions of the Local Government (Mayor of Limerick) and Miscellaneous Provisions Act 2024 act, the office of chief executive of Limerick City and County Council was renamed as director general.

== Functions ==
The chief executive performs the executive functions of the county or city council and has the ultimate responsibility for ensuring the local authority operates smoothly and for carrying into effect policy decisions of the elected council. The chief executive supervises, co-ordinates, manages and pays the employees and officers of the council. The chief executive also makes contracts on behalf of the council and affixes the official seal of the council on documents. The current legislation governing chief executives is Chapter 2 of Part 14 of the Local Government Act 2001, as substituted by the Local Government Reform Act 2014. It is normal practice in Ireland that the chief executive of a local authority will delegate some functions to other staff in the local authority. The elected county or city council must be notified of any delegated functions. However, the chief executive still remains responsible for the acts of the delegate and can take back (i.e., revoke) a responsibility that has been delegated.

== Entering and leaving office ==
Chief executives are recruited through a competitive recruitment process organised by the Public Appointments Service and formally appointed by the Minister for Housing, Local Government and Heritage. Once appointed, the chief executive will remain in office for a term of 7 years (although this can also be extended by an additional three years). The retirement age for County or City Managers is 65. If a Council wishes to suspend or remove a chief executive, a resolution must be passed by the council. At least three-quarters of the Councillors vote for the resolution after 21 days' notice. The Minister may appoint a panel to determine the proposal, or may sanction the removal of the chief executive. Local Government Reform Act 2014 Sec 146

== Deputy chief executives ==
As well as the chief executive, some counties and cities also have Assistant/Deputy chief executive. After consultation with the head of the elected council (Cathaoirleach or Mayor) the chief executive may appoint a deputy chief executive to act on their behalf while they are on leave or absent. In situations where the post of chief executive becomes vacant, the Minister for Housing, Local Government and Heritage must appoint someone temporarily. This temporary appointment will continue until a permanent appointment is made. It may however, be terminated at any time.

== See also ==
- NUTS 3 statistical regions of the Republic of Ireland
- McCarthy Report
- State-sponsored bodies of the Republic of Ireland.
- City manager
