= Electoral division (Ireland) =

Statistical division in Ireland

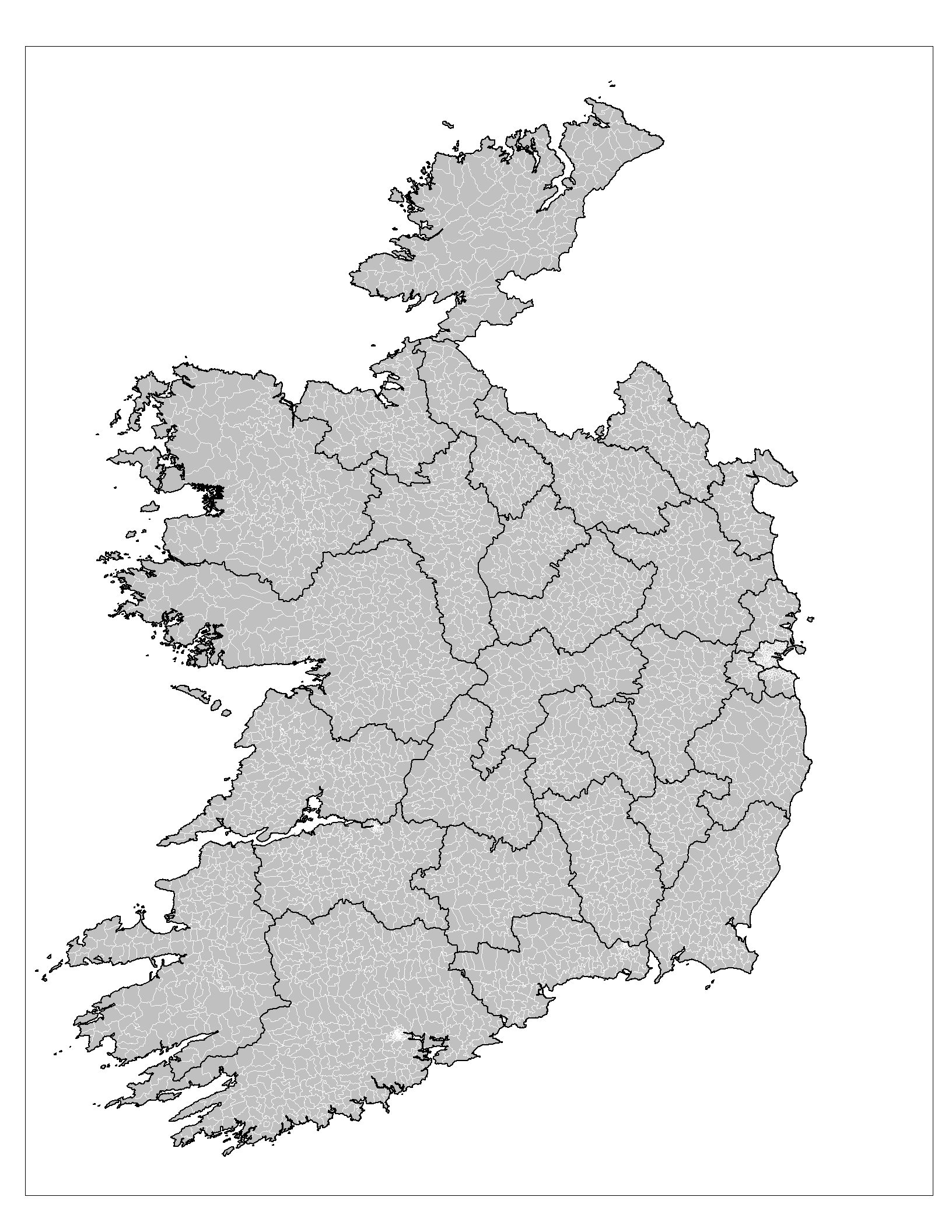
Map of Electoral Divisions in Ireland in 2008

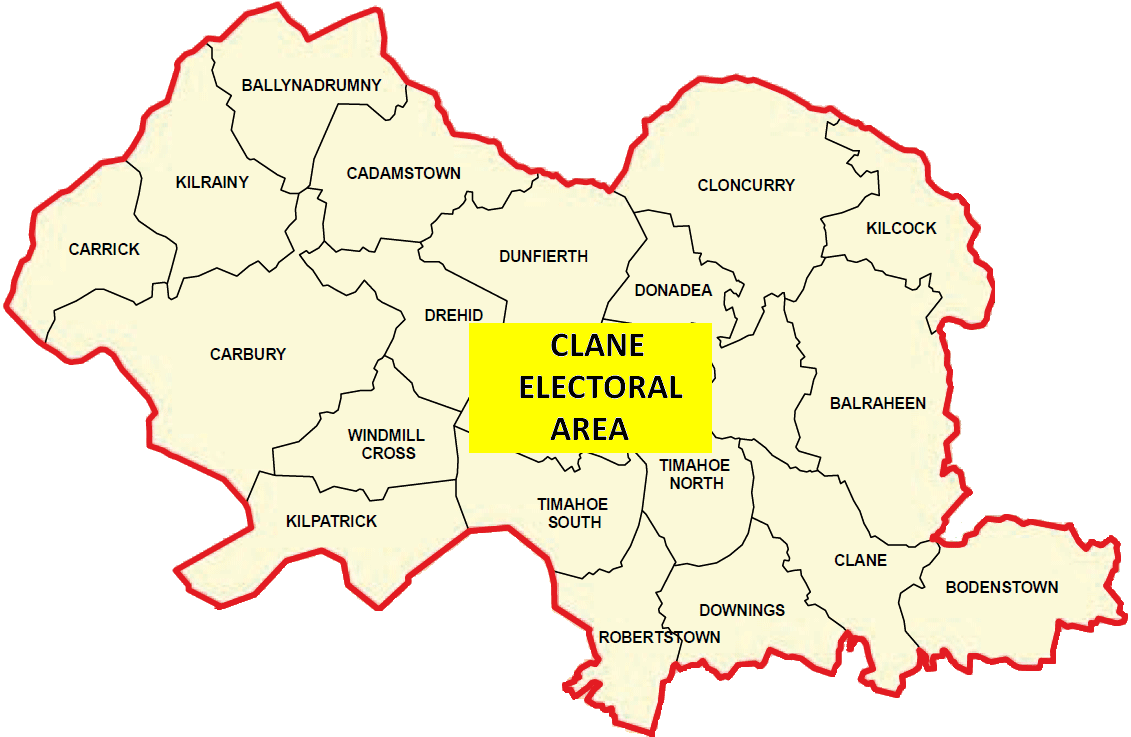
Clane local electoral area, County Kildare, shown divided into its electoral divisions.

An electoral division (ED, Irish: toghroinn) is a legally defined administrative area in the Republic of Ireland, generally comprising multiple townlands, and formerly a subdivision of urban and rural districts. Until 1996, EDs were known as district electoral divisions (DEDs, toghroinn ceantair) in the 29 county council areas and wards in the five county boroughs. Until 1972, DEDs also existed in Northern Ireland. The predecessor poor law electoral divisions were introduced throughout the island of Ireland in the 1830s. The divisions were used as local-government electoral areas until 1919 in what is now the Republic and until 1972 in Northern Ireland.

== History until partition ==
Electoral divisions originated under the Poor Relief (Ireland) Act 1838 as "poor law electoral divisions": electoral divisions of a poor law union (PLU) returning one or more members to the PLU's board of guardians. The boundaries of these were drawn by Poor Law Commissioners, with the intention of producing areas roughly equivalent in both population and "rateable value" (rates being the property tax which funded local government). This meant that while electoral divisions almost always contiguous, they might bear little relation to natural community boundaries. Elections used first-past-the-post in single-member divisions and multiple non-transferable vote in those electing two (or occasionally more) guardians. The 1838 act required electoral divisions to comprise complete townlands; an 1839 amendment empowered the Commissioners to ignore this restriction when constituting a large town into a single electoral division and dividing it into "wards" for poor law elections. Typically, poor law wards matched pre-existing municipal ward boundaries, though the respective electoral franchises differed. In 1872, the Poor Law Commissioners were replaced by the Local Government Board for Ireland (LGBI) which had broader powers. The Commissioners and LGBI had power to revise most local boundaries, including electoral divisions. Returns of the valuation of each electoral division were made to Parliament in 1846, 1866, and 1901.

The Local Government (Ireland) Act 1898 established a system of administrative counties divided into "county districts" (urban and rural districts) run by directly elected county councils and district councils. PLUs comprised one or more county districts, and poor law electoral divisions were renamed district electoral divisions (DEDs). Two rural district councillors were elected from each rural district DED, who were also ex officio guardians of the corresponding PLU. By contrast, urban districts had separate elections for councillors (elected from wards) and PLU guardians (elected from DEDs). The LGBI got temporary power to redraw boundaries to adapt to the 1898 act, which as regards DEDs it used mainly around municipal areas (county boroughs, urban districts, and towns with commissioners). If a municipal border crossed <Name> DED, the LGBI split it into two DEDs, <Name> Urban and <Name> Rural. In general, a town or city's DEDs and wards were given the same boundaries, and a town not divided into wards formed a single DED; however, there were cases of multiple wards in a single DED and vice versa. County electoral divisions (for the county council) were formed from groups of DEDs. The 1898 changes also made DEDs the polling districts for Westminster elections.

Whereas the 1841–1891 censuses had been broken down by civil parish and townland, those of 1901 and 1911 were broken down by DED and townland.

The Local Government (Ireland) Act 1919 mandated the single transferable vote (STV) for the 1920 local elections and later elections, and the LGBI created multi-seat "district electoral areas" by combining one-seat and two-seat DEDs.

== Northern Ireland ==
After the 1920–22 partition of Ireland, the Stormont government took over the LGBI's powers within Northern Ireland; power to define DEDs fell initially to the Minister of Home Affairs, later to the Minister of Health and Local Government, and finally to the Minister of Development. The Parliament of Northern Ireland abolished STV in 1922 and returned to "district electoral divisions" instead of the larger "district electoral areas". The reconstituted DEDs were delineated in 1923 in time for the 1924 local election. The Ulster Unionist Party used gerrymandering to ensure unionist control in areas with small nationalist population majorities. PLUs were abolished in 1948 on the introduction of the National Health Service, but DEDs remained the electoral units for rural districts, and largely aligned with the wards used in urban districts. There were very few changes to DED boundaries made between 1923 and their obsolescence under the Local Government (Boundaries) Act (Northern Ireland) 1971, except to adjust to extension of urban municipal boundaries. The 1926–1951 censuses were published down to townland level, while for those of 1961–1971, the lowest level of detail was DED or ward.

The 1971 act replaced the two-tier county and district local government model with a single-tier district model, with each of the 26 new districts divided into "district electoral divisions to be known as wards". A boundary commissioner delineating the districts and wards could disregard the old DEDs but use them for reference where convenient. The centres of the new districts of Antrim, Castlereagh and Magherafelt were defined in terms of the DEDs of the same names. The worsening of the Troubles meant direct rule was introduced in 1972; among the changes intended to conciliate nationalists was the reintroduction of STV for the 1973 local elections, based on district electoral areas made up of multiple wards. The term "district electoral division" is obsolete, "ward" being used instead. The Local Government Act (Northern Ireland) 1972 requires a boundary commissioner review every 12 years, and the wards were last redefined in 2012 by the Department of the Environment of the then Northern Ireland Executive.

== Republic of Ireland ==
Since the 1919 change, DEDs have had no independent use in what is now the Republic of Ireland; however, they have remained legally defined units used in civil registration, land registration, statistical reporting, and as references for specifying the makeup of larger units, or the location of smaller ones. There were comprehensive revisions of the DEDs in County Dublin in 1971, to facilitate redrawing electoral boundaries in growing suburbs of Dublin city, and again in 1986, when it was divided into the electoral counties of Dún Laoghaire–Rathdown, Fingal, and South Dublin. Otherwise DEDs were rarely if ever changed, so that a few came to cross county/county-borough boundaries which had been adjusted. The Local Government Act 1994 substituted the name "electoral division" to replace both the names "district electoral division" (as used in counties) and "ward" (as used in county boroughs, themselves renamed "cities" by the Local Government Act 2001). This change was commenced in 1996. Ward boundaries had been revised more often than those of DEDs.

There are a total of 3,440 EDs in the state, with an average population of 1,447 and average area of 20.4 square kilometres (5,000 acres). Populations now vary widely, ranging in 2016 from 38,894 for Blanchardstown–Blakestown in Fingal to 12 for Lackagh, North Tipperary and 7 for Ballynaneashagh, Waterford City. The DED/ED has been the lowest level of detail for printed census publications since independence. To maintain confidentiality, the Central Statistics Office (CSO) amalgamates 32 EDs with low population into neighbouring EDs in the presentation of detailed census data. Conversely, more populous EDs are subdivided to provide Small Area Population Statistics (SAPS); whereas sub-DED data could previously be requested from the CSO for a fee, SAPS data has been published online since 2002. The Nomenclature of Territorial Units for Statistics (NUTS) classification for Ireland formerly specified as "local administrative unit" (LAU) the 3,441 EDs (counting the Meath and Louth portions of St Mary's ED separately). Since 2019, Ireland's NUTS LAUs have been the 166 local electoral areas (LEAs). The 2019 Cork city extension left some EDs straddling the County–City boundary, as reflected in the consequential redrawing of the LEAs; that for Carrigaline LEA includes "those parts of the electoral divisions of Ballygarvan, Carrigaline (in the former rural district of Cork), Douglas, Inishkenny, and Monkstown Rural that are not contained within the City of Cork".

== Sources ==
- LGBI (1900). Twenty-seventh annual report of the Local Government Board for Ireland. Command papers. Vol. C. 9480. Dublin: HMSO.
- Local Government (Ireland) Act 1898
- Local Government (Boundaries) Act (Northern Ireland) 1971
