= Galway (barony) =

Barony in County Galway, Ireland

Galway Gaillimh (Irish)
- Barony
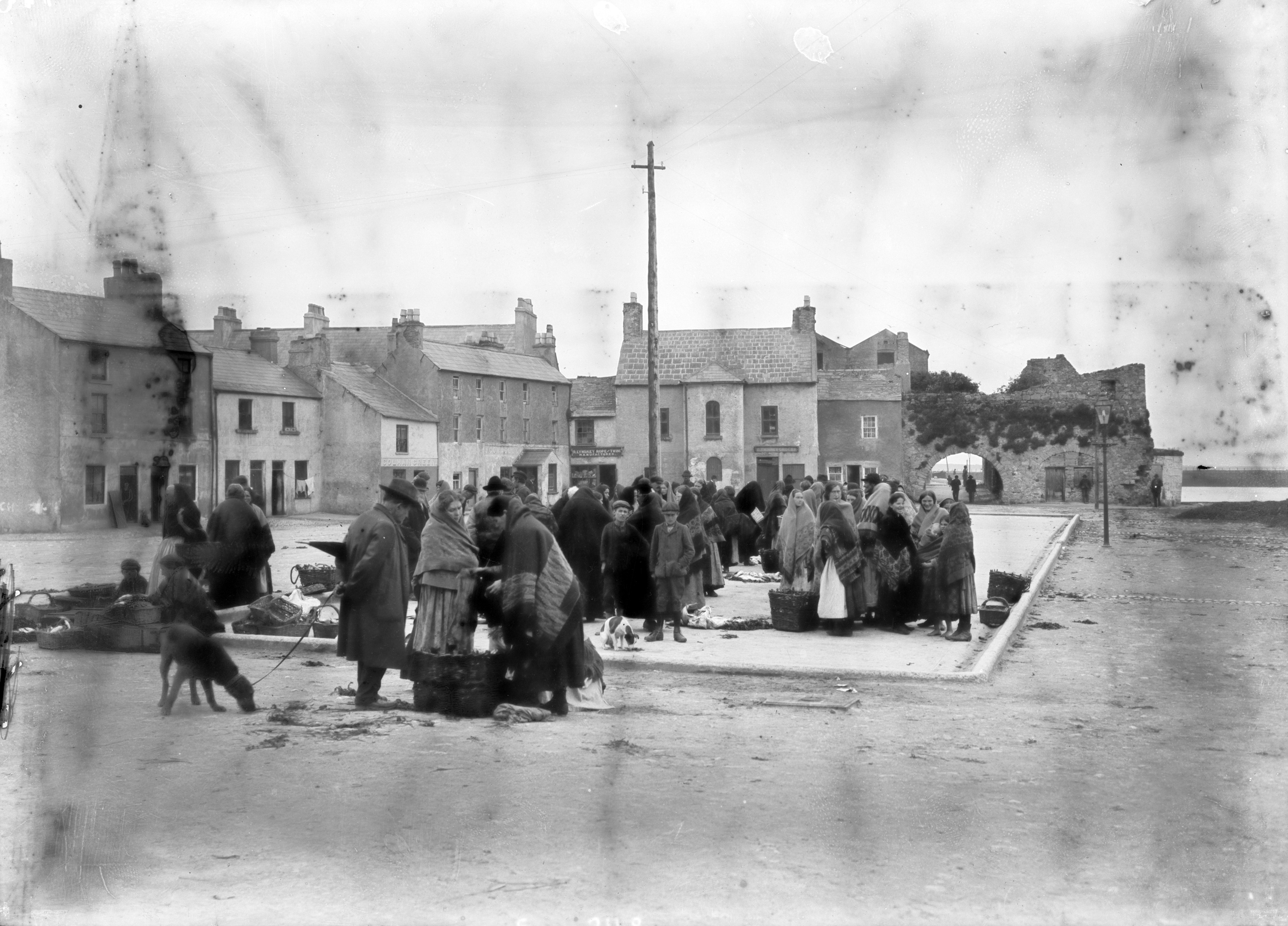
- Fish market, Galway, c. 1905

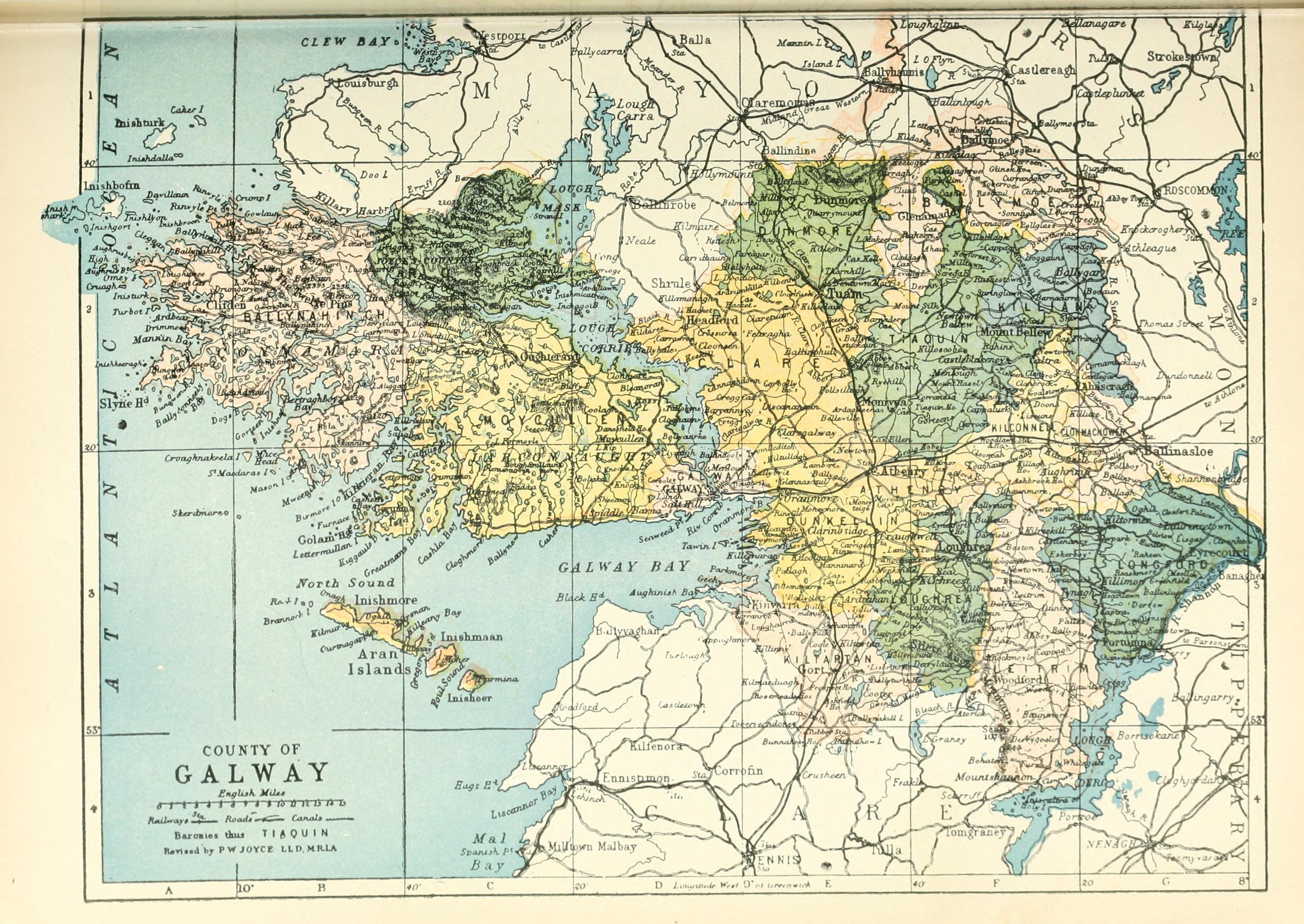
- Barony map of County Galway, 1900; Galway is in the middle, coloured pink.

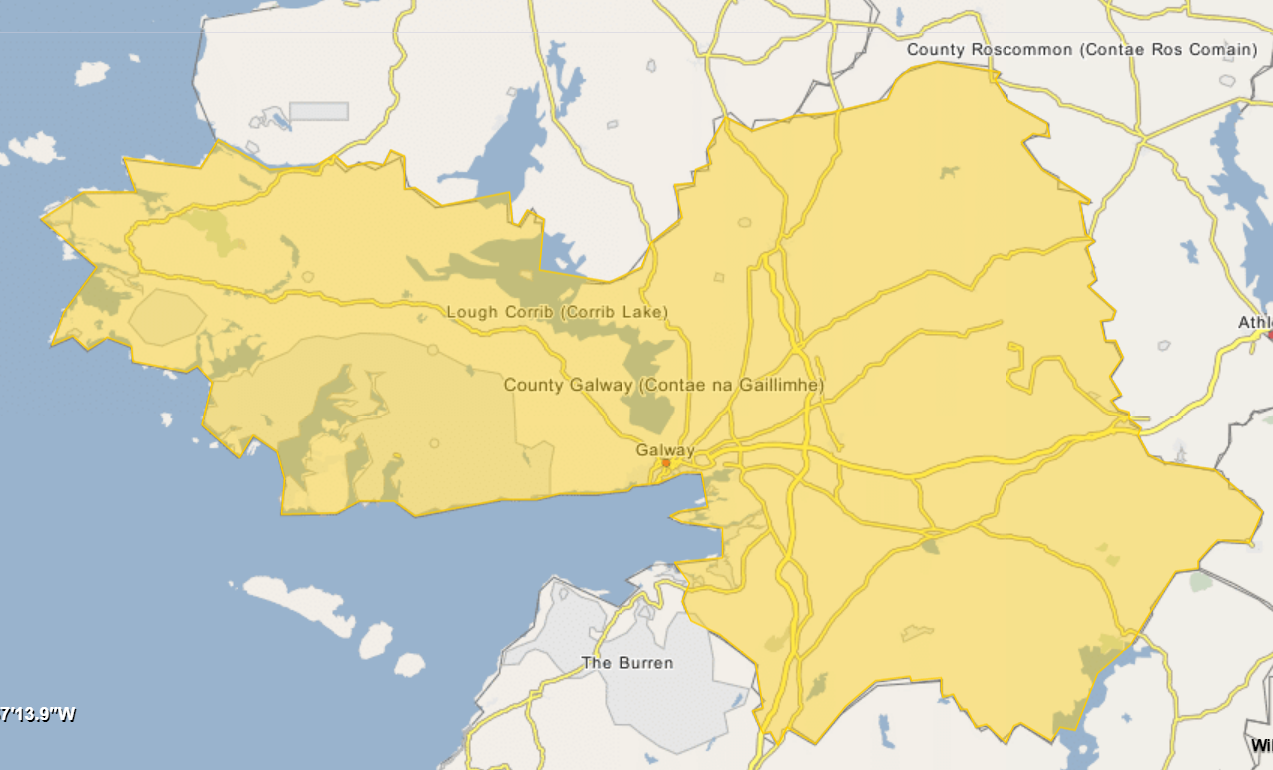
- Location within County Galway
- Coordinates: 53°17′N 9°03′W
- Sovereign state: Ireland
- Province: Connacht
- County: Galway

Area
  - Total: 91.0 km^{2} (35.1 sq mi)

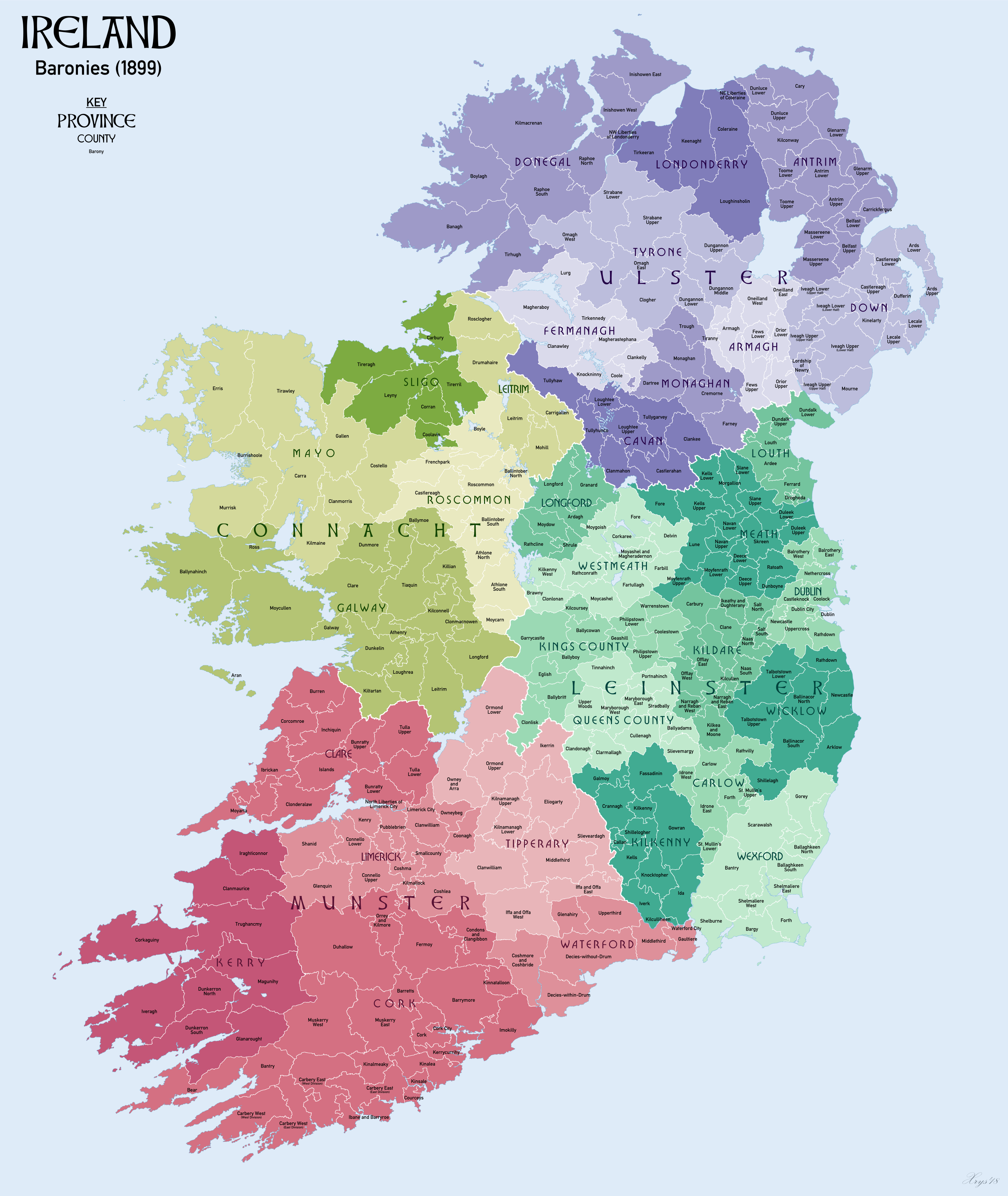
Detail from an 1899 barony map centred on Galway barony

Galway (Irish: Gaillimh) is a barony in Ireland, comprising Galway city and surrounding parts of County Galway. The barony is coterminous with the former County of the Town of Galway, a county corporate created by the town's 1610 charter and abolished by the Local Government (Ireland) Act 1898.

== Boundary ==
The town's 1610 charter erected the town into a corporate county separate from Galway county-at-large, and defined the extent of the county of the town as encompassing the municipal borough of Galway and its "liberties" for two miles around, excluding St Francis Abbey (on St. Stephen's Island) and St Augustine's Fort (now Renmore Barracks). In 1687 the limit was doubled to four miles. About 1770 the county bounds were further extended, and in 1871 the census gave its area as 22,483 acres (9,099 ha). The 1846 Parliamentary Gazetteer describes its bounds as roughly a semicircle with a radius of 4 miles (6.4 km) centred on Galway town, with Galway Bay to the south, from Forramoyle in the west, through Lough Inch to the southern shore of Lough Corrib in the north, then southeast to the north of Killeen, and down to the bay 1 1/2 miles east of Merlin Park.

== Divisions ==
The barony contains 111 townlands. These are in three civil parishes: all of the parish of St Nicholas, covering the centre city; most of Rahoon, to the west; and about half of Oranmore, to the east.

== Government ==
Whereas Galway Corporation governed the borough, a separate grand jury had a parallel authority over the whole county of the town. From 1616 to 1661, the county of the town was excluded from the Presidency of Connaught. Galway was also the county town of County Galway, and within the town were separate county gaols and separate county courthouses for the county-at-large and the county of the town.

The Municipal Corporations (Ireland) Act 1840 abolished the borough and its corporation, but not the county and its grand jury. (Note: The Parliamentary Gazetteer of 1846 erroneously claimed that the county of the town had been abolished under the 1840 act and divided into the "borough of Galway" and the "barony of Galway". While such a division happened in six other corporate counties in 1840, in Galway it was the borough which was abolished rather than the county.) Less powerful town commissioners took over the property of the abolished corporation and had jurisdiction within one mile of St. Nicholas' Church. This was extended to 2 miles in 1853, but an 1878 petition to have the town boundary extended to the limits of the county of the town was rejected. The Local Government (Ireland) Act 1898 merged the county of the town of Galway and the county-at-large of Galway into the administrative county of Galway. The 1898 act made baronies practically redundant but did not formally abolish them.

The town of Galway was separated from the administrative county in 1985 as a county borough, a designation renamed city by the Local Government Act 2001. Boundary extensions since before and after 1985 have given it an area of 5,000 hectares (12,360 acres), less than that of the disused barony of Galway.

== Sources ==
- "Municipal Corporations (Ireland) Act 1840". The Statutes of the United Kingdom of Great Britain and Ireland. Vol. XV Part II. Her Majesty's Printer's. 1840. pp. 599–669. ISBN 9780331531558.
- Prunty, Jacinta; Walsh, Paul (2016). Galway/Gaillimh (PDF). Irish Historic Towns Atlas. Vol. 28. Dublin: Royal Irish Academy. ISBN 9781908996916.
