= Poor Law union =

Early local government unit in UK and Ireland

Poor law union
- Also known as: Poor law district
- Category: Ad hoc board
- Location: England and Wales
- Created by: Poor Law Amendment Act 1834
- Created: 1834
- Abolished by: Local Government Act 1929
- Abolished: 1930
- Additional status: Registration district; Rural sanitary district
- Government: Board of guardians
- Subdivisions: Civil parish

A poor law union was a geographical territory, and early local government unit, in Great Britain and Ireland.

Poor law unions existed in England and Wales from 1834 to 1930 for the administration of poor relief. Prior to the Poor Law Amendment Act 1834 the administration of the English Poor Laws was the responsibility of the vestries of individual parishes, which varied widely in their size, populations, financial resources, rateable values and requirements. From 1834 the parishes were grouped into unions, jointly responsible for the administration of poor relief in their areas and each governed by a board of guardians. A parish large enough to operate independently of a union was known as a poor law parish. Collectively, poor law unions and poor law parishes were known as poor law districts. The grouping of the parishes into unions caused larger centralised workhouses to be built to replace smaller facilities in each parish. Poor law unions were later used as a basis for the delivery of registration from 1837, and sanitation outside urban areas from 1875. Poor law unions were abolished by the Local Government Act 1929, which transferred responsibility for public assistance to county and county borough councils.

== England and Wales ==
The English Poor Laws laid out the system of poor relief that existed in England and Wales from the reign of Elizabeth I until the emergence of the modern welfare state after the Second World War. Historian Mark Blaug has argued that the Poor Law system provided "a welfare state in miniature, relieving the elderly, widows, children, the sick, the disabled, and the unemployed and underemployed".

The functions of poor law unions were exercised by boards of guardians, partly elected by ratepayers, but also including magistrates.

Some parishes, many in the metropolitan area of London, were able to avoid amalgamation into unions because of earlier local acts that regulated their poor law administration. The Metropolitan Poor Act 1867 (30 & 31 Vict. c. 6) allowed the Poor Law Board to include these parishes in unions.

Until 1894 the guardians consisted of justices of the peace along with other members elected by rate-payers, with higher rate-payers having more votes. JPs were removed and plural voting stopped in 1894, but nobody actually receiving poor relief was allowed to vote.

Their areas were espoused for other functional districts, such as civil registration of all births, marriages and deaths which became law from 1837 and rural sanitary districts established in 1875.

In 1894 rural districts and urban districts were set up based on the sanitary districts (and therefore indirectly on the unions). In 1930, under the Local Government Act 1929, the poor law unions were finally abolished and their responsibilities transferred to the county councils and county boroughs.

== Ireland ==
Under the Poor Relief (Ireland) Act 1838, three Poor Law Commissioners divided Ireland into poor law unions, in which paupers would receive poor relief paid for by a poor rate extracted by local poor law valuations (ratings of rate payers). The name "union" was adopted from the English model although boundaries were unrelated to civil parishes. A union was named after the town on which it was centred, usually where its workhouse stood. Unions were defined as groups of poor law electoral divisions, in turn groups of townlands. Electoral divisions returned members (guardians) to the board of guardians, to which ratepayers who paid higher rates had more votes. During and after the Great Famine, the impoverished west was redrawn to create more unions for easier administration and for computation of where suffering was most endemic. When the Irish General Register Office was established in 1864, each union became a superintendent registrar's district, thus electoral divisions together formed a dispensary or registrar's district. The Local Government (Ireland) Act 1898 divided administrative counties into urban and rural districts, with each rural district corresponding to the non-urban portion of a poor law union within the county. In the Irish Free State, poor law unions and rural districts were abolished in 1925 and the powers of boards of guardians transferred to the county councils' Board of Health. In Northern Ireland, poor law unions survived until the Northern Ireland Health and Social Care Service in 1948.

== Scotland ==
The Poor Law in Scotland was reformed by the Poor Law (Scotland) Act 1845. Poorhouses (as workhouses were generally known in Scotland) were organised at parish level. The Act permitted, but did not require, parishes to join to build and operate poorhouses. A union of parishes operating a single poorhouse was known as a Combination.
