= Municipal borough =

Former type of British and Irish local government

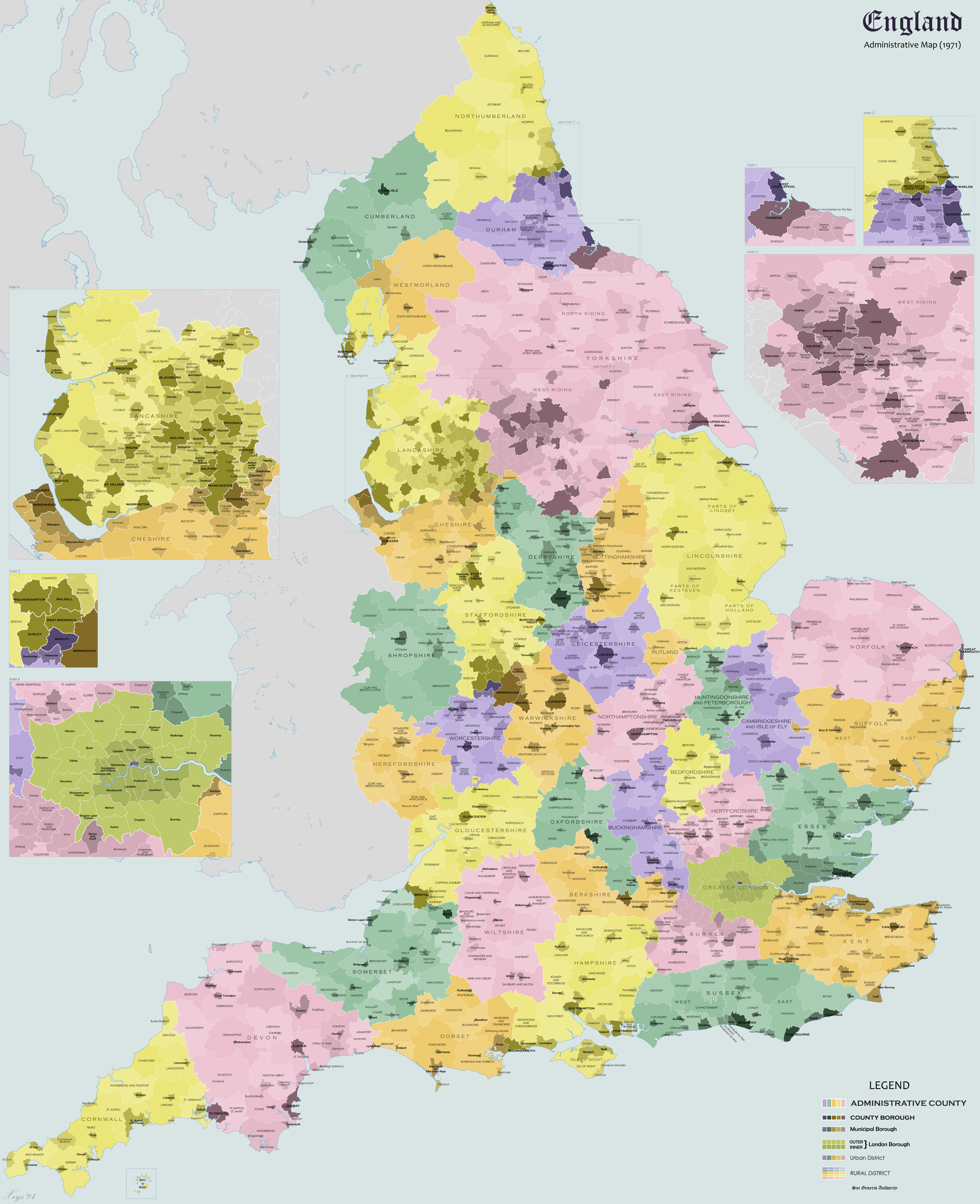
- Map of municipal boroughs of England in 1971 (named in boldface text), alongside administrative counties, county boroughs, urban districts, rural districts
- Category: Local government district
- Location: England and Wales, Republic of Ireland, Northern Ireland
- Found in: Administrative county
- Created by: Municipal Corporations Act 1835 (England and Wales); Municipal Corporations (Ireland) Act 1840 (Ireland)
- Created: 1835
- Abolished by: Local Government Act 1972 (England and Wales); Local Government (Boundaries) Act (Northern Ireland) 1971 (Northern Ireland); Local Government Act 2001 (Republic of Ireland)
- Abolished: 1974 (England and Wales); 1973 (Northern Ireland); 2002 (Republic of Ireland)
- Possible types: County borough; Non-county borough
- Possible status: City; Royal borough
- Government: Municipal corporation
- Subdivisions: Wards

A municipal borough was a type of local government district which existed in England and Wales between 1836 and 1974, in Northern Ireland from 1840 to 1973 and in the Republic of Ireland from 1840 to 2002. Broadly similar structures existed in Scotland from 1833 to 1975 with the reform of royal burghs and creation of police burghs.

== England and Wales ==
=== Municipal Corporations Act 1835 ===
Boroughs had existed in England and Wales since medieval times. By the late Middle Ages they had come under royal control, with corporations established by royal charter. These corporations were not popularly elected: characteristically they were self-selecting oligarchies, were nominated by tradesmen's guilds or were under the control of the lord of the manor. A Royal commission was appointed in 1833 to investigate the various borough corporations in England and Wales. In all 263 towns were found to have some form of corporation created by charter or in existence by prescription. The majority had self-elected common councils, whose members served for life. Where there was an election, the incumbent members of the corporation often effectively nominated the electorate. Eleven boroughs were manorial court leets. Following the report of the royal commission, legislation was introduced to reform borough corporations.

The Municipal Corporations Act 1835 provided for a reformed form of town government, designated a municipal borough. The Act introduced a uniform system of town government in municipal boroughs, with an elected town council, consisting of a mayor, aldermen and councillors to oversee many local affairs. The legislation required all municipal corporations to be elected according to a standard franchise, based on property ownership. The Act reformed 178 boroughs with effect from 1 January 1836. At the same time, a procedure was established whereby the inhabitant householders of a town could petition the Crown via the privy council to grant a charter of incorporation, constituting the area a municipal borough. The attempts to incorporate large industrial towns such as Birmingham, Bolton, Manchester and Sheffield by Whig and Radical "incorporationists" were bitterly contested by Tory "anti-incorporationists". The Tory objections to the legality of the charters led to them boycotting elections to the new boroughs until the enactment of the Borough Charters Confirmation Act 1842.

A number of further acts of parliament amended the 1835 legislation. All of these were repealed and replaced by the Municipal Corporations Act 1882. The 1882 Act and the consolidating Local Government Act 1933 provided the statutory basis for municipal boroughs up to their abolition. An important change in the 1933 legislation removed the right to petition for incorporation from inhabitant householders. In future, petitions could only be made by existing urban or rural district councils.

The boroughs unreformed by the Act were not immediately abolished. Several of them subsequently sought new charters as municipal boroughs; those that did not were finally abolished in 1887 by the Municipal Corporations Act 1886. Only the City of London Corporation survived as a local authority in an unreformed state; the City undertook a major reform of its democratic structure in 2005.

In 1873 the Association of Municipal Corporations was formed to represent the interests of the boroughs collectively; its membership included both county and non-county boroughs. The AMC was later to be a strong advocate for expanding county boroughs and unitary local government, and it was at the annual conference of the AMC in 1965 that Richard Crossman called for a reform of all local government. This speech eventually led to the Redcliffe-Maud Report recommending large unitary councils for all England.

=== Corporation and council ===
Each municipal borough possessed a corporation uniformly designated as the Mayor, Aldermen, and Burgesses of the town. The only exception was where the borough enjoyed city status; in this case "burgesses" became "citizens". In a handful of cities the chief magistrate was granted the further dignity of lord mayor.

The corporation was a body corporate with perpetual succession, and included all registered electors or "burgesses" of the borough. However, the actual administration was carried out by a town council, which was in effect a committee representative of the community at large. All those eligible to vote were entered in the "burgess roll", which was compiled by the town clerk annually.

==== Town councils ====
The town council of each municipal borough consisted of a mayor, aldermen, and councillors. The councillors were directly elected by the burgesses for a three-year term, with one-third of their membership retiring each year. Boroughs with a population of more than 6,000 were divided into wards with separate elections held in each ward annually. One-quarter of the council were aldermen, who were elected by the council for a six-year term. Half of the aldermen were elected every third year at the council's annual meeting. It was originally envisaged that the council would choose persons from outside of the municipal body. In practice, however, the aldermanic benches were almost exclusively filled by the promotion of long-serving councillors. The mayor of the borough was elected for a one-year term, although he was eligible for re-election indefinitely. Under the original legislation the mayor was required to be a councillor or alderman. The Municipal Corporations Act 1882 empowered the council to elect any suitably qualified inhabitant of the borough as mayor. However, the mayoralty continued to be almost universally conferred on a senior alderman or councillor.

Municipal elections were originally held on 1 November, with the mayoral election and filling of aldermanic vacancies on 9 November. Elections were cancelled during the First and Second World Wars, and the November 1948 elections were postponed until May 1949. From that date, municipal elections were held on the second Thursday of May. In view of the forthcoming local government reorganisation, the 1972 elections were rescheduled to 4 May, with no elections in 1973 and all sitting councillors and aldermen holding their seats until midnight on 31 March 1974.

=== Functions ===
The municipal boroughs created under the 1835 Act had powers relating to electoral registration, providing a watch, making byelaws, and holding various civil and criminal courts. The types of courts which could be held depended on whether the borough had been given a separate commission of the peace or its own quarter sessions; those which had their own quarter sessions were also required to appoint a coroner. The mayor was ex officio made a justice of the peace. The mayor was also required to serve as returning officer for parliamentary elections, except in those boroughs which were counties corporate, where the borough council appointed a sheriff whose duties included serving as returning officer. To fund their work the borough council was allowed to set and collect rates.

Municipal boroughs were not automatically given powers to provide or maintain infrastructure under the 1835 Act. Many boroughs were covered by separate bodies of improvement commissioners responsible for matters such as paving, lighting and cleaning streets, supplying water and providing sewers. These improvement commissioners continued to exist alongside the borough councils unless the commissioners chose to transfer their powers to the council.

From 1848 onwards local boards could also be established for providing infrastructure and overseeing public health. Where local board districts were created covering municipal boroughs the borough council was often, but not always, appointed to serve as the local board. In some places it was deemed necessary for the local board district to cover a larger or smaller territory than the borough, in which case a separate local board was elected. The overlapping functions of borough councils, improvement commissioners and local boards were gradually consolidated. Many boroughs took over the functions of commissioners or separate local boards under the Public Health Act 1872, which established urban sanitary districts, with borough councils usually being designated as the urban sanitary authority. There were a handful of exceptions where commissioners and local boards continued to operate alongside borough councils until the Local Government Act 1888 required the remaining anomalies to be addressed; from 1889 all borough councils were sanitary authorities with powers to provide infrastructure and oversee public health.

=== County and non-county boroughs ===
In 1889, county councils were created across England and Wales under the Local Government Act 1888. Boroughs were divided into two sorts, with some becoming county boroughs which were entirely self-governing and independent from county council administration.

The non-county boroughs had more limited powers of self-government, and shared power with county councils. In 1894, towns which had not been incorporated as boroughs became urban districts with similar powers to municipal boroughs.

The title of "borough" was considered to be more dignified than "urban district", and so many larger urban districts petitioned to be granted the status of a municipal borough, and many were granted this right. Borough status did not substantially increase local government powers, although municipal boroughs above a certain size had the right to run primary education.

=== Abolition ===
Under the Local Government Act 1958, small municipal boroughs could be absorbed by surrounding rural districts to become rural boroughs, with the powers of a parish council. Seven small boroughs in Cornwall, Devon and Shropshire underwent this process.

The remaining municipal boroughs, of which there were over 200, were abolished on 1 April 1974 by the Local Government Act 1972. In England, they were replaced by metropolitan or non-metropolitan districts and in Wales by districts.

In most cases, the civic privileges and coat of arms of the abolished boroughs were inherited by one of the new local authorities. District councils were permitted to apply for a charter to receive borough status, while small municipal boroughs became successor parishes with town councils headed by a town mayor. In a few cases charter trustees, a special committee of district councillors, were formed to perpetuate the mayoralty of a town or city.

== Ireland ==
The Municipal Corporations (Ireland) Act 1840 followed the example of the legislation in England and Wales. Unlike the 1835 Act, the Irish Act abolished nearly all of the country's boroughs, reforming just 10. Inhabitants of the larger of the abolished boroughs or of any town with a population of 3,000 could petition the crown for incorporation under the Act. In the event, only one additional borough was created when Wexford received a charter of incorporation in 1846. The corporation and town council were identical in their constitution to the English boroughs, and each borough was divided into wards with three, six or nine councillors per ward and one alderman for every three councillors.

The Local Government (Ireland) Act 1898 designated the six largest municipalities (Belfast, Cork, Dublin, Limerick, Derry and Waterford) as county boroughs. The Local Government (Ireland) Act 1919 introduced a system of proportional representation into municipal elections. Wards were replaced by electoral areas, and the entire council was to be elected triennially. Separate elections of aldermen and councillors were ended, with all members of the council elected by popular vote. One-quarter of the elected members were entitled to the title of "alderman", which was used to designate the first candidates elected in each area. The remaining successful candidates being "councillors".

Under the Government of Ireland Act 1920, Ireland was partitioned in 1921, between Northern Ireland, which would remain in the United Kingdom, and the remainder, which left the United Kingdom in 1922 as the Irish Free State.

=== Northern Ireland ===
On establishment, Northern Ireland contained the county boroughs of Belfast and Londonderry, with no municipal boroughs. The Parliament of Northern Ireland abolished proportional representation in local government elections in 1922, and amended the 1840 Act in 1926, allowing urban districts to petition the Governor for a charter of incorporation. Accordingly, by 1972 the number of boroughs had increased to 12 in number.

The system of local government was reorganised in 1973, with 26 local government districts replacing all county and municipal boroughs as well as urban and rural districts. The city or borough status conferred by the municipal charters passed to the new district councils.

=== Irish Free State and the Republic of Ireland ===
Nine boroughs (four county boroughs and five municipal boroughs) were within the territory of the Irish Free State in 1922. Two new boroughs were created by statute. In 1930, the borough of Dún Laoghaire was created by the amalgamation of the four urban districts of Blackrock, Dalkey, Kingstown, and Killiney and Ballybrack in County Dublin. This borough was later abolished in 1994. In 1937 the town of Galway was reconstituted as a municipal borough. It became a county borough in 1986.

The Local Government Act 2001 abolished municipal boroughs. County boroughs were replaced by statutory "cities", while the title of "borough" was retained for the other towns holding the status.

== See also ==
- List of rural and urban districts in England
- List of rural and urban districts in Wales
- Urban district (England and Wales)
- Urban and rural districts (Ireland)
- Rural district
- County borough
- Parliamentary borough
