= LGBI (disambiguation) =

LGBI may refer to:

- Lokpriya Gopinath Bordoloi International Airport, northeastern India
- Local Government Board for Ireland (1872–1922)
- "Lesbian, gay, bisexual, and intersex"; see Intersex and LGBT
