= Drumcondra, Clonliffe and Glasnevin =

Former local government area in County Dublin

Drumcondra, Clonliffe and Glasnevin is a former second-tier local government area within County Dublin. It was created as a township in 1878. In 1899, it briefly became an urban district, before being abolished in 1900, with its area absorbed into the city of Dublin.

== Area ==
Township of Drumcondra, Clonliffe and Glasnevin

The Township of Drumcondra, Clonliffe and Glasnevin, governed by town commissioners, was created by the Drumcondra, Clonliffe and Glasnevin Township Act 1878, including the districts of Drumcondra, Clonliffe and Glasnevin, in the barony of Coolock and county of Dublin. In 1899, it became an urban district under the Local Government (Ireland) Act 1898.

In 1900, the urban district was abolished and the area was transferred from the county into the jurisdiction of the city of Dublin.
