= Administrative counties of Ireland =

Administrative counties were a unit of local government created by an Act of the Parliament of the United Kingdom for use in Ireland in 1899. Following the separation of the Irish Free State from the United Kingdom of Great Britain and Ireland, administrative counties continued in use in the two parts of the island of Ireland under their respective sovereign jurisdictions. They continued in use until 1973 in Northern Ireland and until 2002 in the Republic of Ireland.

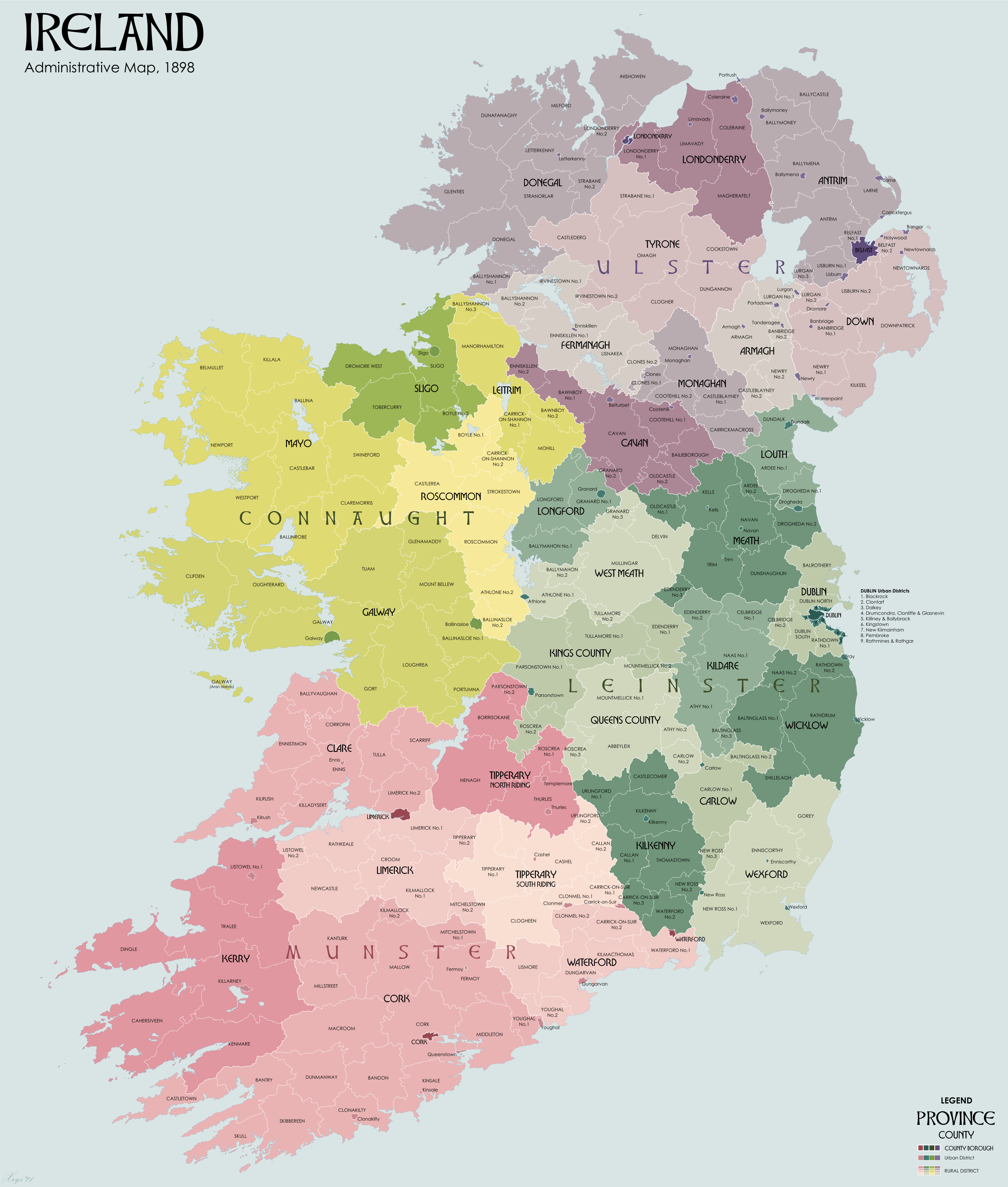
Administrative Counties

== History ==
The administrative counties were created by the Local Government (Ireland) Act 1898. The Act established a new system of local government in Ireland, consisting of county councils, similar to the systems created for England and Wales by the Local Government Act 1888 and for Scotland by the Local Government (Scotland) Act 1889.

As in England and Wales, the Act created county boroughs of Ireland's largest towns which were independent of their surrounding county councils, but in contrast to England, the county boroughs were deemed to be administrative counties themselves. Thus there were 38 administrative counties, of which 8 were county boroughs. After the separation of the Irish Free State, eight administrative counties remained in Northern Ireland (including two county boroughs), while the Irish Free State had 30 administrative counties (including four county boroughs).

The administrative counties of Northern Ireland were abandoned as local government areas by the Local Government Act (Northern Ireland) 1972. The Act came into effect in 1973.

Galway city become a county borough in 1986. In 1994 the administrative county of Dublin was abolished and its area was divided into three parts for the purposes of local government: Dún Laoghaire–Rathdown, Fingal and South Dublin.

In the Republic of Ireland, the 1898 Act was replaced by the Local Government Act 2001, which came into operation on 1 January 2002. The Act adopted the simple title county in place of administrative county.

== Former administrative counties of Northern Ireland ==
The administrative counties in the area now constituting Northern Ireland were created as follows:

Administrative county	Components
County of Antrim	The existing judicial county of Antrim less the portion of the City of Belfast situated therein
County of Armagh	The existing judicial county of Armagh less the portion of the town of Newry situated therein
County of Down	The existing judicial county of Down less the portions of the City of Belfast and the town of Lisburn situated therein Part of the judicial county of Armagh (the portion of the town of Newry situated therein)
County of Fermanagh	The existing judicial county of Fermanagh
County of Londonderry	
County of Tyrone	The existing judicial county of Tyrone

=== County boroughs ===
County borough	Year
Belfast County Borough	1899
Londonderry County Borough	1899

== Former administrative counties of the Republic of Ireland ==
The administrative counties in the area now constituting the Republic of Ireland were created as follows:

Administrative county	Components
County of Carlow	The existing judicial county of Carlow So much of Queen's County as forms part of the town of Carlow
County of Cavan	The existing judicial county of Cavan
County of Clare	The existing judicial county of Clare Part of the judicial county of Galway (Drummaan, Inishcaltra North and Mountshannon EDs)^{a}
County of Cork	The existing judicial county of Cork
County of Donegal	The existing judicial county of Donegal
County of Dublin	The existing judicial county of Dublin less the portion of the township of Bray situated therein
County of Galway	The existing judicial county of Galway less the Ballinchalla, Inishcaltra North, Mountshannon, Owenbrin and Rosmoylan EDs; Part of the judicial county of Roscommon (the portion of the town of Ballinasloe situated therein); The judicial County of the Town of Galway
County of Kerry	The existing judicial county of Kerry
County of Kildare	The existing judicial county of Kildare
County of Kilkenny	The existing judicial county of Kilkenny less the portion of the town of New Ross situated therein The judicial County of the City of Kilkenny; Part of the judicial county of Waterford (Kilculliheen ED)
King's County	The existing judicial county of King's County
County of Leitrim	The existing judicial county of Leitrim
County of Limerick	The existing judicial county of Limerick
County of Longford	The existing judicial county of Longford
County of Louth	The existing judicial county of Louth; The judicial County of the Town of Drogheda
County of Mayo	The existing judicial county of Mayo less Ballaghaderreen, Edmondstown EDs; Part of the judicial county of Galway (Ballinchala, Owenbrin EDs)^{b} Part of the judicial county of Sligo (Ardnaree North, Ardnaree South Rural, Ardnaree South Urban EDs)^{c}
County of Meath	The existing judicial county of Meath
County of Monaghan	The existing judicial county of Monaghan
Queen's County	The existing judicial county of Queen's County less the portion of the town of Carlow situated therein
County of Roscommon	The existing judicial county of Roscommon less the portions of the towns of Athlone and Ballinasloe situated therein Part of the judicial county of Galway (Rosmoylan ED); Part of the judicial county of Mayo (Ballaghaderreen, Edmondstown EDs)
County of Sligo	The existing judicial county of Sligo less Ardnaree North, Ardnareee South Rural, Ardnaree South Urban EDs
County of Tipperary, North Riding	The existing judicial county of the North Riding of Tipperary less Cappagh, Curraheen, Glengar EDs
County of Tipperary, South Riding	The existing judicial county of the South Riding of Tipperary; Part of the judicial county of the North Riding of Tipperary (Cappagh, Curraheen, Glengar EDs); Part of the judicial county of Waterford (the portions of the town of Carrick-on-Suir and of the borough of Clonmel situated therein)
County of Waterford	The existing judicial county of Waterford less Kilculliheen ED and the portions of the town of Carrick-on-Suir and the borough of Clonmel situated therein.
County of Westmeath	The existing judicial county of Westmeath; Part of the judicial county of Roscommon (the portion of the town of Athlone situated therein)
County of Wexford	The existing judicial county of Wexford; Part of the judicial county of Kilkenny (the portion of the town of New Ross situated therein)
County of Wicklow	The existing judicial county of Wicklow; Part of the judicial county of Dublin (the portion of the township of Bray situated therein)

=== County boroughs ===
County borough	Year
Cork	1899
Dublin	1899
Galway	1986
Limerick	1899
Waterford	1899

== County and county borough boundaries ==
The Act placed a number of townlands in a different administrative county from their parent county, following a policy to keep each urban sanitary districts and poor law union within a single administrative county.

The boundaries of the counties and county boroughs, which came into effect on 18 April 1899, were defined by orders of the Local Government Board for Ireland.

== See also ==
- Administrative counties of England
- Administrative counties of Wales
- Counties of Ireland
- Local government in Northern Ireland
- Local government in the Republic of Ireland
