= Local Government Act 1925 =

Law of the Irish Free State reforming local government

Oireachtas
- Long title: AN ACT TO AMEND THE LAW RELATING TO LOCAL GOVERNMENT AND FOR OTHER PURPOSES CONNECTED THEREWITH.
- Citation: No. 5 of 1925
- Territorial extent: Irish Free State (later Ireland)
- Considered by: Dáil Éireann
- Considered by: Seanad Éireann
- Assented to: 26 March 1925
- Commenced: 26 March 1925

Legislative history

First chamber: Dáil Éireann
- Bill citation: No. 54 of 1924
- Introduced by: Minister for Local Government and Public Health (Séamus Burke)
- Introduced: 23 October 1924

The Local Government Act 1925 (No. 5) was enacted by the Oireachtas of the Irish Free State on 26 March 1925.

The Irish Free State had inherited the structure of local authorities created by United Kingdom legislation, including the Local Government (Ireland) Act 1898 and the Local Government (Ireland) Act 1919. The Act abolished rural district councils (except in County Dublin), passing their powers to the county councils.

The first local elections in the Irish Free State were held under the amendments provided by this act. They had been postponed by legislation passed since 1922. They were to be held no later than three months after the passage of this act. These local elections were held on 23 June 1925.

The abolition of rural districts was extended to Dublin under the Local Government (Dublin) Act 1930.
