= Local Government (Dublin) Act 1930 =

Oireachtas
- Long title: AN ACT TO EXTEND THE AREA OF THE CITY OF DUBLIN BY INCLUDING THEREIN THE URBAN DISTRICT OF PEMBROKE, THE URBAN DISTRICT OF RATHMINES AND RATHGAR, AND CERTAIN RURAL AREAS, TO ESTABLISH A NEW BOROUGH COMPRISING THE URBAN DISTRICTS OF BLACKROCK, DUN LAOGHAIRE, DALKEY, AND KILLINEY AND BALLYBRACK, TO REGULATE AND AMEND THE LOCAL GOVERNMENT OF THE CITY OF DUBLIN AS SO EXTENDED AND THE LOCAL GOVERNMENT OF THE COUNTY OF DUBLIN, TO ESTABLISH AND REGULATE THE LOCAL GOVERNMENT OF THE SAID NEW BOROUGH, AND TO MAKE PROVISION FOR DIVERS MATTERS CONNECTED WITH OR INCIDENTAL TO THE SEVERAL MATTERS AFORESAID.
- Citation: No. 27 of 1930
- Signed: 17 July 1930

Legislative history
- Bill citation: No. 51 of 1929
- Introduced by: Minister for Local Government and Public Health (Richard Mulcahy)
- Introduced: 5 December 1929

The Local Government (Dublin) Act 1930 is an Act of the Oireachtas (Irish parliament) which altered the administration of County Dublin and Dublin City.

== Provisions ==
Amongst other matters, it provided for:

- the abolition of the urban districts of Pembroke and Rathmines and Rathgar and their inclusion within the city limits;
- the abolition of urban districts of Dún Laoghaire, Blackrock, Dalkey, Killiney and Ballybrack, and the creation as their successor of the borough of Dún Laoghaire;
- the transfer, from 1 April 1931, of territory from the county to the city, termed the "added rural areas", including Drumcondra, Glasnevin, Donnybrook and Terenure;
- the abolition of rural districts in County Dublin (which had been abolished elsewhere under the Local Government Act 1925.
