= Town commissioners =

Former local government structure in Ireland

Town commissioners were elected local government bodies that existed in urban areas in Ireland from the 19th century until 2002. Larger towns with commissioners were converted to urban districts by the Local Government (Ireland) Act 1898, with the smaller commissions continuing to exist beyond partition in 1922. The idea was a standardisation of the improvement commissioners established in an ad-hoc manner for particular towns in Britain and Ireland in the eighteenth century. The last town commissioners in Northern Ireland were abolished in 1962. In the Republic of Ireland, the remaining commissions became town councils in 2002, and abolished in 2014.

== Lighting of Towns Act 1828 ==
Lighting of Towns (Ireland) Act 1828 (Note: The citation of this act by this short title was authorised by section 1 of, and the first schedule to, the Short Titles Act 1896. Due to the repeal of those provisions it is now authorised by section 19(2) of the Interpretation Act 1978.)
- Act of Parliament
- Parliament of the United Kingdom
- Long title: An Act to make Provision for the lighting, cleansing, and watching of Cities, Towns Corporate, and Market Towns, in Ireland, in certain Cases.
- Citation: 9 Geo. 4. c. 82
- Territorial extent: United Kingdom

Dates
- Royal assent: 25 July 1828
- Commencement: 25 July 1828 (Note: The Acts of Parliament (Commencement) Act 1793.)
- Repealed: 25 March 1899
Other legislation
Amended by	Statute Law Revision Act 1873; Statute Law Revision Act 1890; Public Authorities Protection Act 1893
Repealed by	Local Government (Ireland) Act 1898

Status: Repealed

Text of statute as originally enacted

The first town commissioners were established by the Lighting of Towns (Ireland) Act 1828 (9 Geo. 4. c. 82).

This was "adoptive" legislation, which ratepayers in a borough or market town could choose to enact in their community. As the existing borough corporations were ineffective as local authorities the act came into force in sixty-five towns. William Neilson Hancock explained the act in 1877 thus:

The first clause repealed a number of Acts of Parliament, those of 1765, 1773, 1785, and 1796. Those were all temporary acts of the Irish Parliament, and the British Parliament in 1807 renewed all of them for 21 years, and that renewal came to expire in the year 1828. It was then renewed for one year for that Session of Parliament to allow legislation to take place. Those Acts are all founded upon the vestry system of management of towns. Some of the large towns had by local Acts got lighting and other matters under vestries in the parishes, and all those Acts were founded upon the idea of extending the vestry system to the management of towns; but the vestries never made the way in Ireland which they did in England, because there was no poor law. The basis of vestries being so popular in England, being on account of the poor law administration. There was no poor law in Ireland until 1838, and the vestries had no real basis to rest on; and in 1828 they were in a most unpopular position, because the agitation which overthrew them in 1833 by the extinction of what is called parish cess, the same as the church rates in England, was just at its height. 1828 was within five years of the total extinction of Irish church rates, so that they had become quite unpopular and unmanageable bodies.

Whereas local acts appointing commissioners for particular places specified a boundary or distance inside which the commissioners' powers would be confined, no such limit was specified in the 1828 Act. Thomas Larcom of the Irish Ordnance Survey wrote of the commissioners in 1846:

The boundaries of their assessments are very vaguely defined. Sometimes a mile, or half a mile around the town, or from its centre; sometimes the whole or part of the parish. An attempt was made to survey them for the Ordnance Maps, but they could not be ascertained with sufficient precision.

== Municipal reform 1840 ==
In 1840 the majority of Irish boroughs were abolished by the Municipal Corporations (Ireland) Act 1840, and the commissioners established by the 1828 Act became the only local council. The town commissioners were recognised as successor to the borough, retaining corporate property and the municipal coat of arms. Any town with property of more than £100 that lost its borough corporation, but had not adopted the 1828 Act, was to establish "municipal commissioners". There was, in fact, only one town to which this applied: Carrickfergus in County Antrim.

== Towns Improvement (Ireland) Act 1854 ==
Towns Improvement (Ireland) Act 1854 (Note: Section 2.)
- Act of Parliament
- Parliament of the United Kingdom
- Long title: An Act to make better Provision for the paving, lighting, draining, cleansing, supplying with Water, and Regulation of Towns in Ireland.
- Citation: 17 & 18 Vict. c. 103
- Territorial extent: Ireland (Note: Section 100.)

Dates
- Royal assent: 10 August 1854
- Commencement: 10 August 1854
Other legislation
Amended by	Public Libraries (Ireland) Act 1855; Public Health (Ireland) Act 1878; Public Authorities Protection Act 1893; Statute Law (Repeals) Act 1976; Statute Law Revision (Northern Ireland) Act 1980

Status: Amended

Text of statute as originally enacted

The Towns Improvement (Ireland) Act 1854 (17 & 18 Vict. c. 103) allowed electors of populous places to choose to establish town commissioners. This enabled many newer communities that had never had municipal status to gain local government bodies. Many of the towns governed by the 1828 Act replaced this with the new legislation as it provided the commissioners with greater powers.

== Townships established by local acts ==
A number of towns took a different route to establish local authorities in their areas, by having private acts passed in parliament. These acts established "townships" with defined boundaries, defined the powers of the commissioners, gave them powers to make rates, named the first members and provided a procedure for subsequent elections. The majority of townships were formed in the rapidly growing suburbs of Dublin. To gain further powers or adjust their boundaries the township commissioners had to apply for a further act of Parliament.

== Changes in the 1870s ==
In 1872 the Local Government Board for Ireland was formed. One of its duties was to consider applications for the formation of commissioners under the 1854 Act, and for alteration of the areas of existing local government towns. The board issued annual reports on its activities, detailing the finances and condition of the various municipalities under its control.

In 1878 Ireland was divided into sanitary districts, with all commissioners in towns with a population of more than 6,000 becoming urban sanitary authorities. The Local Government Board had the power to designate additional towns with commissioners as sanitary districts.

=== Towns governed under the 1854 Act ===
There were 76 such towns in 1881:

- Arklow, County Wicklow
- Athy, County Kildare
- Ardee, County Louth
- Athlone, County Roscommon and County Westmeath
- Antrim, County Antrim
- Aughnacloy, County Tyrone
- Bagenalstown, County Carlow
- Balbriggan, County Dublin
- Ballymena, County Antrim
- Ballymoney, County Antrim
- Belturbet, County Cavan
- Ballyshannon, County Donegal
- Banbridge, County Down
- Bangor, County Down
- Ballybay, County Monaghan
- Ballinasloe, County Galway and County Roscommon
- Ballina, County Mayo
- Boyle, County Roscommon
- Carlow, County Carlow
- Callan, County Kilkenny
- Clonakilty, County Cork
- Carrick-on-Suir, County Tipperary
- Cashel, County Tipperary
- Cavan, County Cavan
- Cootehill, County Cavan
- Coleraine, County Londonderry
- Carrickmacross, County Monaghan
- Castleblayney, County Monaghan
- Clones, County Monaghan
- Cookstown, County Tyrone
- Castlebar, County Mayo
- Dundalk, County Louth
- Dromore, County Down
- Enniscorthy, County Wexford
- Ennis, County Clare
- Fermoy, County Cork
- Gorey, County Wexford
- Gilford, County Down
- Holywood, County Down
- Killiney and Ballybrack, County Dublin
- Kells, County Meath
- Kinsale, County Cork
- Keady, County Antrim
- Killarney, County Kerry
- Longford, County Longford
- Lismore, County Waterford
- Larne, County Antrim
- Lisburn, County Antrim and County Down
- Lurgan, County Armagh
- Letterkenny, County Donegal
- Limavady, County Londonderry
- Loughrea, County Galway
- Maryborough, Queen's County
- Mountmellick, Queen's County
- Mullingar, County Westmeath
- Midleton, County Cork
- Naas, County Kildare
- Newbridge, County Kildare
- Navan, County Meath
- New Ross, County Wexford
- Nenagh, County Tipperary
- Newtownards, County Down
- Parsontown, King's County
- Portadown, County Armagh
- Rathkeale, County Limerick
- Roscommon, County Roscommon
- Skibbereen, County Cork
- Strabane, County Tyrone
- Tullamore, King's County
- Trim, County Meath
- Templemore, County Tipperary
- Thurles, County Tipperary
- Tipperary, County Tipperary
- Tandragee, County Antrim
- Tuam, County Galway
- Westport, County Mayo

According to the 1878 report of The Local Government Board, the 1854 Act was adopted in Strandtown, County Antrim on 25 February 1878. However the town is not listed in later reports, and was subsequently incorporated into the borough of Belfast.

=== Towns governed under the 1828 Act ===
Only 11 towns were still governed by the act:

- Armagh, County Armagh
- Bandon, County Cork
- Downpatrick, County Down
- Dungannon, County Tyrone
- Fethard, County Tipperary
- Mallow, County Cork
- Monaghan, County Monaghan
- Omagh, County Tyrone
- Tralee, County Kerry
- Wicklow, County Wicklow
- Youghal, County Cork

=== Towns and townships under special acts ===
There were 14 towns with commissioners formed under such legislation:

- Blackrock, County Dublin
- Bray, County Wicklow
- Clontarf, County Dublin
- Dalkey, County Dublin
- Drumcondra, Clonliffe and Glasnevin, County Dublin
- Enniskillen, County Fermanagh
- Galway, County Galway
- Kingstown, County Dublin
- New Kilmainham, County Dublin
- Newry, County Armagh and County Down
- Pembroke, County Dublin
- Queenstown, County Cork
- Rathmines and Rathgar, County Dublin

=== Towns governed under the Municipal Corporations (Ireland) Act 1840 ===
Only one town had established municipal commissioners following the Municipal Corporations (Ireland) Act 1840:

- Carrickfergus, County Antrim

In addition to these 102 towns there were 11 boroughs, making 113 towns and cities with some form of local government on Ireland. For completeness, the boroughs were

- Belfast
- Clonmel
- Cork
- Drogheda
- Dublin
- Kilkenny
- Limerick
- Derry
- Sligo
- Waterford
- Wexford (restored 1846)

== Changes in 1899–1901 ==
The Local Government (Ireland) Act 1898 created a new type of local council, the urban district governed by an urban district council. All town commissioners that were sanitary authorities became urban district councils. In addition, the Local Government Board was given the power to constitute any other local government town with a population of more than 1,500 as an urban district, although the ratepayers could petition to prevent the application of this section of the act.

The effect of this was that the number of towns with commissioners was greatly reduced. Two towns still operating under the 1828 Act, Monaghan and Wicklow, were promoted to the 1854 Act by section 41 of the 1898 Act. By 1902, 74 urban districts had been formed, leaving only 30 towns still governed under the 1854 Act. These towns formed part of the surrounding rural district also created by the Local Government (Ireland) Act 1898 for nearly all local government purposes, compared with the urban district councils, who enjoyed considerable powers. Over the next few years the number varied as some towns became urban districts and other communities adopted the 1854 Act.

== Town commissioners in Northern Ireland ==
Following partition in 1922, four towns with commissioners situated in the six counties of Northern Ireland. The number was reduced to three in 1925 when Downpatrick became an urban district. The remaining town commissioners were dissolved in 1959 and 1962, their functions being transferred to the rural district council:

- Antrim, County Antrim, dissolved 1962
- Aughnacloy, County Tyrone, dissolved 1959
- Gilford, County Down, dissolved 1959

== Town commissioners in independent Ireland ==
In the Irish Free State (Ireland from 1937), town commissioners continued to exist until 2002. The 1854 Act was still occasionally used to create new local government towns. The Local Government Act 1925 enabled existing town commissioners to dissolve themselves and for urban district councils to downgrade themselves to commissioners.

Where commissioners ceased to exist, in the towns of Callan, Fethard, Newcastle West, Rathkeale, Roscommon and Tullow, their duties were taken over by the county council. However, the town still had a legal existence and separate rates were levied in its area, and the county council had to prepare accounts as commissioners for the town. For example, Newcastle West in County Limerick, whose commissioners were dissolved in 1941, received a grant of a coat of arms by the Chief Herald of Ireland in 1980 – the grant being to "Limerick County Council for the Town of Newcastle West". The Local Government Act 1994 abolished these towns as distinct entities.

The Local Government Act 2001 redesignated both town commissioners and urban district councils as town councils from 1 January 2002. The Local Government Reform Act 2014 abolished town councils. Municipal districts of the county council perform the functions previously performed by the separate town councils.

=== List of town commissioners in Ireland 1922–2002 ===
- Ardee, County Louth
- Balbriggan, County Dublin
- Ballinasloe, County Galway
- Ballybay, County Monaghan
- Ballyshannon, County Donegal
- Bandon, County Cork
- Bantry, County Cork
- Belturbet, County Cavan, downgraded from Urban District 1950
- Boyle, County Roscommon
- Callan, County Kilkenny, dissolved 1940
- Cootehill, County Cavan, downgraded from Urban District 1950
- Droichead Nua or Newbridge, County Kildare
- Edenderry, County Offaly
- Gorey, County Wexford
- Granard, County Longford, downgraded from Urban District 1944
- Greystones, County Wicklow, created 1984
- Fethard, County Tipperary, dissolved 1936
- Kilkee, County Clare
- Leixlip, County Kildare, created 1988
- Lismore, County Waterford
- Loughrea, County Galway
- Mountmellick, County Laois
- Muine Bheag or Bagenalstown, County Carlow
- Mullingar, County Westmeath
- Newcastle West, County Limerick, dissolved 1941
- Passage West, County Cork, downgraded from Urban District 1942
- Portlaoise, County Laois
- Rathkeale, County Limerick, dissolved 1926
- Roscommon, County Roscommon, dissolved 1927
- Shannon, County Clare, created 1982
- Tramore, County Waterford, created 1948
- Tuam, County Galway

== Sources ==
Primary

- Simons, N., ed. (1829). "9 Georgii IV cap. LXXXII: An Act to make Provision for the lighting, cleansing, and watching of Cities, Towns Corporate, and Market Towns, in Ireland, in certain Cases.". The Statutes of The United Kingdom of Great Britain and Ireland. Vol. 11. London: Eyre & Spottiswoode. pp. 593–609.
  - "Lighting of Towns (Ireland) Act, 1828". electronic Irish Statute Book.
- "17 & 18 Victoriae cap. CIII: An Act to make better Provision for the paving, lighting, draining, cleansing, supplying with Water, and Regulation of Towns in Ireland.". A Collection Of The Public General Statutes, Passed In The Seventeenth And Eighteenth Year Of The Reign Of Her Majesty Queen Victoria: Being The Second Session Of The Sixteenth Parliament Of The United Kingdom Of Great Britain And Ireland. London: Eyre & Spottiswoode. 1854. pp. 359–389.
  - "Towns Improvement (Ireland) Act, 1854". electronic Irish Statute Book.

Secondary

- Roche, Desmond (1982). Local Government in Ireland. Dublin.
- Webb, John J. (1918). Municipal government in Ireland, mediæval & modern. Dublin: Talbot Press. pp. 182–185, 240–243, 253–256, 260–262, 276–278.
