= Killiney and Ballybrack =

Former local government area in County Dublin

Killiney and Ballybrack is a former second-tier local government area within County Dublin. It was created as a township in 1866. In 1899, it became an urban district. It was abolished in 1930, with its area becoming part of the borough of Dún Laoghaire.

== Area ==
Killiney and Ballybrack

The Township of Killiney and Ballybrack, governed by town commissioners, was established on 18 July 1866, comprising the villages of Killiney and Ballybrack. In 1899, it became an urban district under the Local Government (Ireland) Act 1898.

The urban district of Killiney and Ballybrack was abolished in 1930, with its area becoming part of the borough of Dún Laoghaire. The borough was abolished in 1994, on the establishment of the county of Dún Laoghaire–Rathdown.

== Notes, citations and sources ==
=== Further reading ===
- Maitiú, Séamas Ó (2003). Dublin's Suburban Towns 1834–1930. Four Courts Press. ISBN 9781851827237.

=== External links ===
- Killiney and Ballybrack Township layer on OpenStreetMap
- Killiney and Ballybrack Urban District layer on OpenStreetMap
- Dublin Historic Maps: Dublin Townships and Urban Districts, between 1847 and 1930
- Townlands in Co. Dublin
