= Borough of Dún Laoghaire =

Former local government area in County Dublin, Ireland (1930–1994)

Borough of Dun Laoghaire Buirg Dhún Laoghaire
- Borough
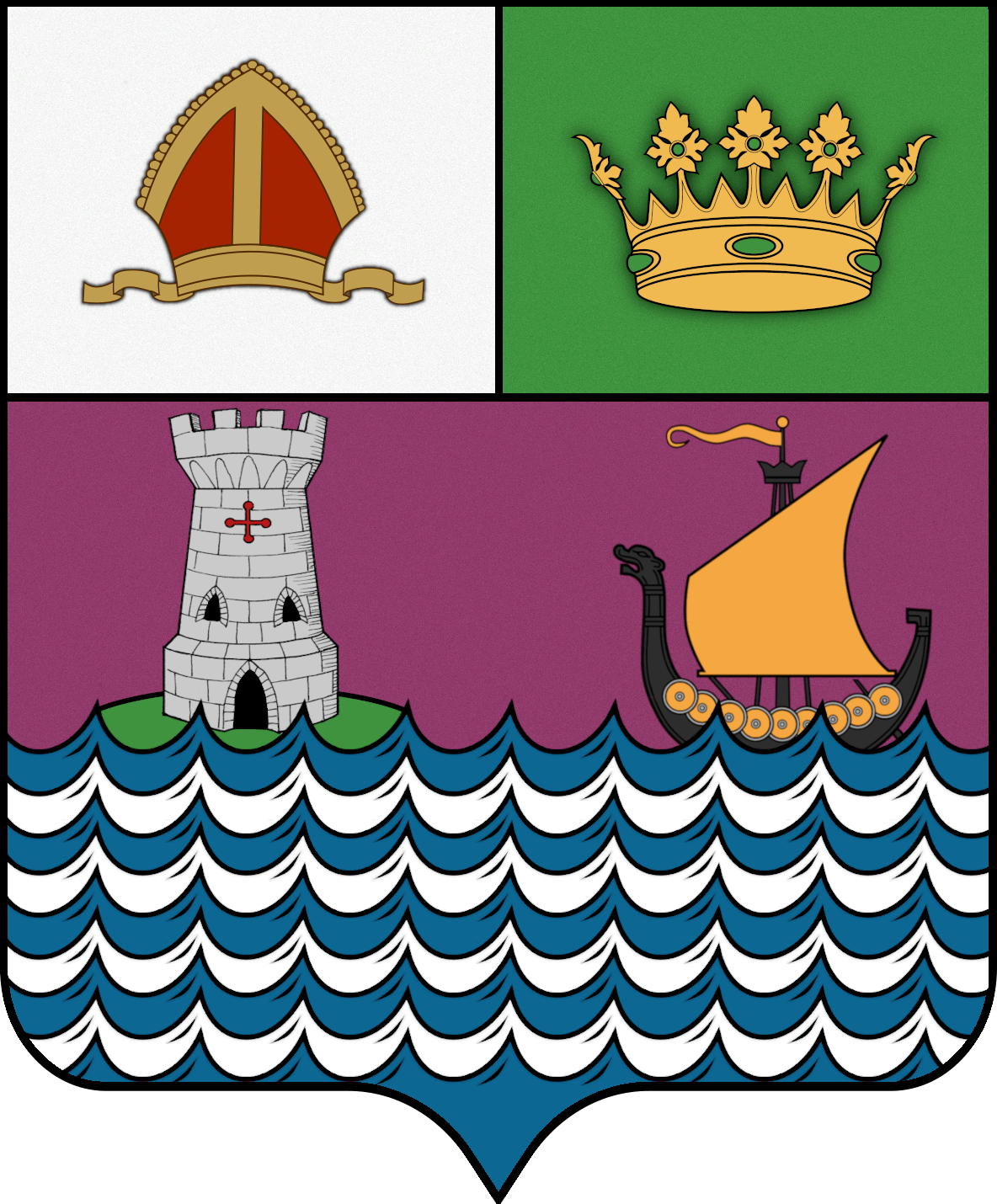
- Coat of arms
- Country: Ireland
- Province: Leinster
- County: County Dublin
- Established: 1930
- Abolished: 1994
- Named for: Dún Laoghaire

Government
  - Local authority: Corporation of Dún Laoghaire

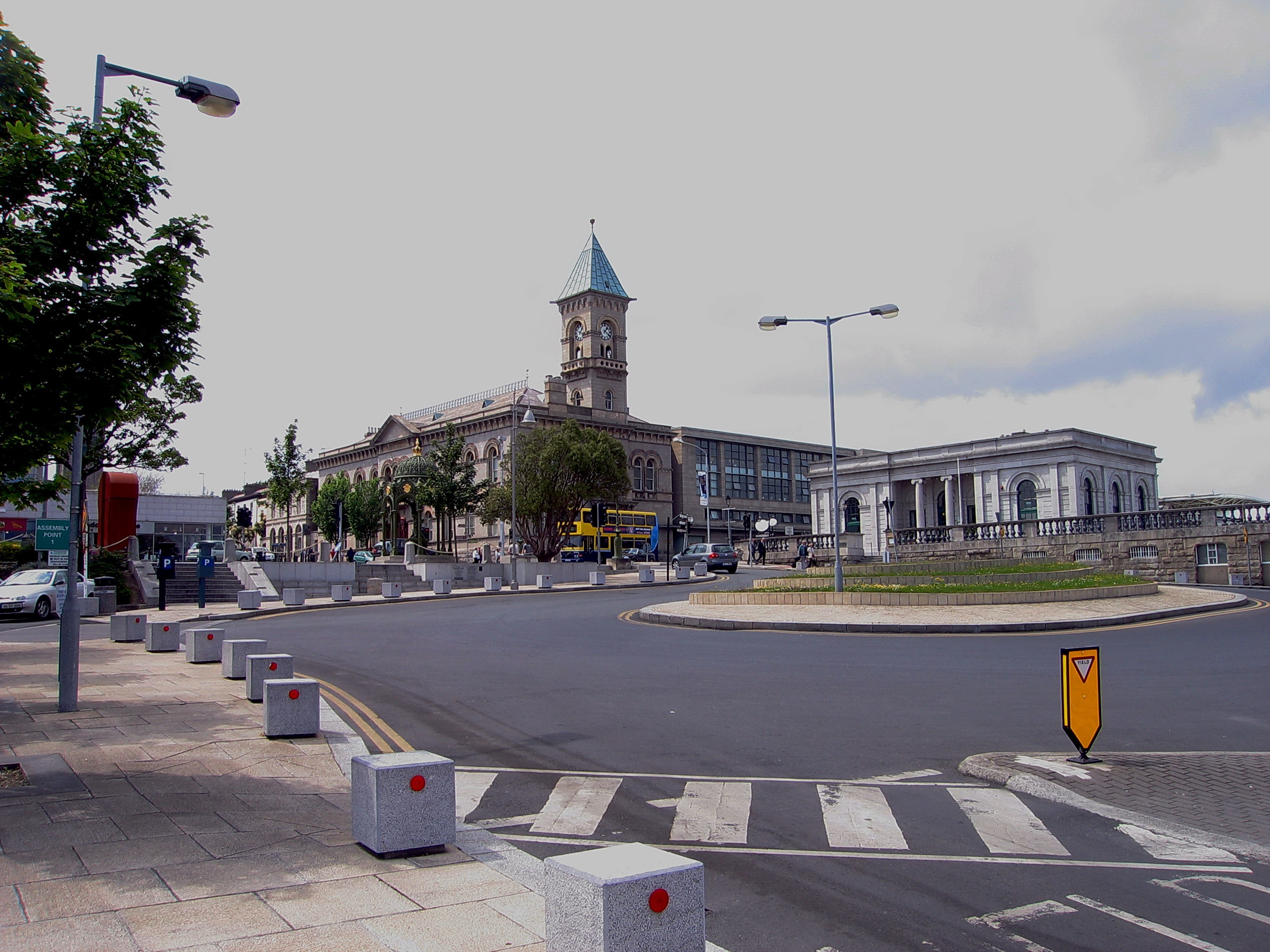
Dún Laoghaire Town Hall

The Borough of Dún Laoghaire was a borough on the southern coast of County Dublin, Ireland from 1930 to 1994. Its local authority was the Corporation of Dún Laoghaire.

The borough was formed under the Local Government (Dublin) Act 1930 from the urban districts of Blackrock, Dalkey, Dún Laoghaire, and Killiney and Ballybrack.

Whereas most Irish boroughs had the limited autonomy of an urban district, Dún Laoghaire had greater powers and was for many purposes practically a county borough independent of Dublin County Council.

The corporation headquarters was in Dún Laoghaire Town Hall. Dún Laoghaire was one of seven (non-county) boroughs and urban districts with its own Vocational Education Committee (VEC).

On 1 January 1994, under the Local Government (Dublin) Act 1993, County Dublin ceased to exist, and was succeeded by three new counties: Fingal, Dún Laoghaire–Rathdown and South Dublin. Under the same provisions, the borough of Dún Laoghaire also ceased to exist. The powers of the Corporation of Dún Laoghaire were transferred to the new Dún Laoghaire–Rathdown County Council. Whereas the VECs of other boroughs and urban districts were absorbed by the surrounding county's VEC in 1997, Dún Laoghaire VEC remained in existence until VECs were abolished in 2013, whereupon its functions were transferred to Dublin and Dún Laoghaire Education and Training Board.

Population of Dún Laoghaire borough
Year	Pop.	±%
1936	39,785	—
1946	44,674	+12.3%
1951	47,920	+7.3%
1956	47,552	−0.8%
1961	47,792	+0.5%
1966	51,772	+8.3%
1971	51,373	−0.8%
1979	54,244	+5.6%
1981	54,496	+0.5%
1986	54,715	+0.4%
1991	55,540	+1.5%
