= Urban and rural districts (Ireland) =

Former type of local government area in Ireland

Urban district
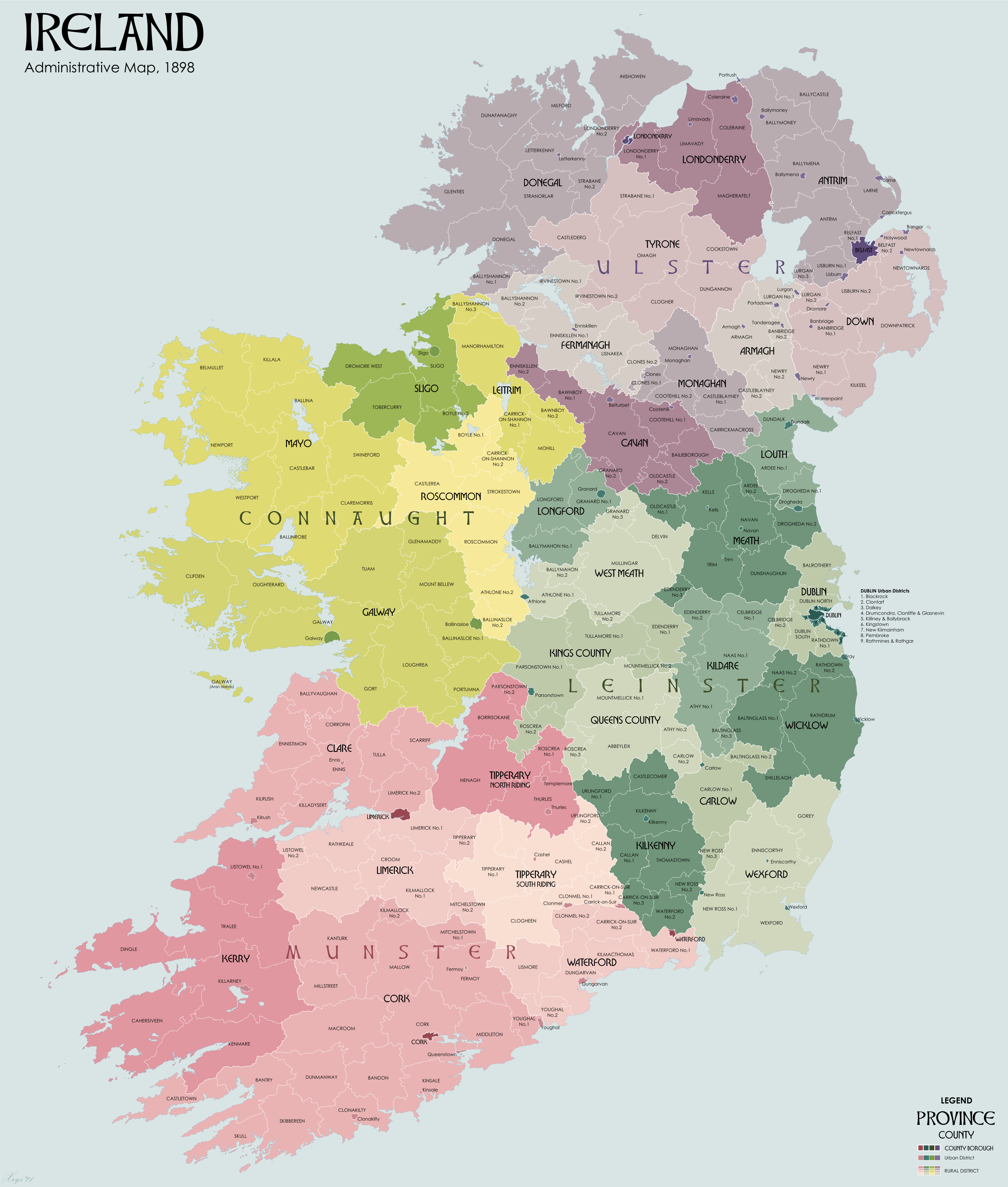
- Local Government Areas in 1898
- Category: Local government area
- Location: Ireland
- Found in: Administrative county
- Created by: Local Government (Ireland) Act 1898
- Created: 1899
- Abolished by: Local Government (Boundaries) Act (Northern Ireland) 1971; Local Government Act 2001; Local Government Reform Act 2014
- Abolished: Northern Ireland: 1973; Ireland: 2002/2014
- Government: Urban district council

Urban and rural districts were divisions of administrative counties in Ireland created in 1899. These local government areas elected urban district councils (UDCs) and rural district councils (RDCs) respectively which shared responsibilities with a county council. They were established when all of Ireland was part of the United Kingdom.

In Northern Ireland, both urban and rural districts were abolished in 1973. In the Republic of Ireland, which had left the United Kingdom in 1922 as the Irish Free State, rural districts were abolished in the Irish Free State in 1925, except in County Dublin, where they were abolished in 1930. Urban district councils continued until 2002, when they were replaced by town councils. These were abolished in turn in 2014, resulting in a single tier only of local government in the Republic of Ireland.

== Creation ==
Urban districts and rural districts were created in 1899 under the Local Government (Ireland) Act 1898 based on the urban sanitary districts created by the Public Health (Ireland) Act 1878, and the suburban townships adjacent to Dublin city. Urban districts had powers greater than towns with town commissioners but less than the municipal boroughs preserved by the Municipal Corporations (Ireland) Act 1840 or created subsequently. This followed a similar creation in England and Wales under the Local Government Act 1894.

== Northern Ireland ==
The rural and urban districts in Northern Ireland were abolished in 1973 under the Local Government (Boundaries) Act (Northern Ireland) 1971, and replaced with a system of unitary districts.

== Republic of Ireland ==
The Irish Free State established in 1922 (which became Ireland in 1937) continued the structure of local government which had been in place under United Kingdom law.

Rural districts outside of County Dublin were abolished in 1925, and in County Dublin in 1930. The areas of former rural districts continue to be used to define electoral geography such as Dáil constituencies.

Changes to urban districts:

- In 1900, Clontarf, Drumcondra, Clonliffe and Glasnevin, and New Kilmainham, previously within the county of Dublin, were abolished and incorporated into the city of Dublin
- In 1930, the borough of Dún Laoghaire was created as part of the reforms enacted in County Dublin by the Local Government (Dublin) Act 1930. The new borough was formed by amalgamating the four urban districts of Blackrock, Dalkey, Dún Laoghaire, and Killiney and Ballybrack
- In 1930, Pembroke and Rathmines and Rathgar, previously within the county of Dublin, were abolished and incorporated into the city of Dublin in 1930
- In 1937, the urban district of Galway was elevated to the status of a borough
- In 1942, Howth, which had become an urban district within the county of Dublin in 1918, was abolished and incorporated into the city of Dublin
- Passage West ceased to exist in 1942
- Granard ceased to exist in 1944
- Belturbet ceased to exist in 1950

The above changes left a total of 49 urban districts in being, which continued unchanged into the 1990s. Numerous changes to boundaries with adjoining local authorities were also made over the years.

Urban districts were renamed as "towns" under the Local Government Act 2001. These were in turn abolished in 2014 under the Local Government Reform Act 2014.
