= County council =

Form of local government

A county council is the elected administrative body governing an area known as a county. This term has slightly different meanings in different countries.

== Australia ==
In the Australian state of New South Wales, county councils are special purpose local governments, to which a group of local government areas delegate the provision of certain services. Note that although New South Wales has counties, the county councils are not governments of the counties (which have never had governments), but rather of distinct county districts.

== Norway ==
In Norway, a county council (Norwegian: Fylkesting) is the highest governing body of a county municipality (fylkeskommune). The county council sets the scope of the county municipal activity. The council is led by the Chairman of the County Council, more commonly called a County Mayor (fylkesordfører). Members of the council are elected for a four-year term through the general local elections, which can extended for a second four-year term. It is common for members of a county council to also hold seats in municipal councils, but very rare that they also hold legislative (Storting) or other government office, without a leave of absence.

The (elected) county mayor should not be confused with the (appointed) county governor.

The county council has its roots in Amtsformandskabet created in 1837. Starting in 1964, members of the county councils were appointed by the municipal councils. In 1975, the first general elections were held for the county councils.

== Ireland ==
The county councils created under British rule in 1899 continue to exist in Ireland, although they are now governed under legislation passed by the Oireachtas, with the principal act being the Local Government Act 2001.

=== History ===
==== 1899–1922 ====
The Local Government (Ireland) Act 1898 introduced county councils to Ireland, with a lower tier of governance of urban and rural districts. The administrative and financial business carried by county grand juries and county at large presentment sessions were transferred to the new councils. Principal among these duties were the maintenance of highways and bridges, the upkeep and inspection of lunatic asylums and the appointment of coroners. The new bodies also took over some duties from poor law boards of guardians in relation to diseases of cattle and from the justices of the peace to regulate explosives.

The Irish county councils differed in constitution from those in Great Britain. Most of the council was directly elected: each county was divided by the Local Government Board for Ireland into district electoral divisions, each returning a single councillor for a three-year term. In addition urban districts were to form electoral divisions: depending on population they could return multiple county councillors. The county councils were also to consist of "additional members":

- The chairman of each rural district council in the county was to be an ex officio member. Where the chairman had already been elected to the council or was disqualified, the RDC was to appoint another member of their council to be an additional member.
- The council could also co-opt one or two additional members for a three-year term.

The first county council elections were held on 6 April 1899, and the first business of their inaugural meetings being the appointment of additional members. The triennial elections were postponed in 1914 on the outbreak of World War I.

The Local Government (Ireland) Act 1919 introduced proportional representation by means of the single transferable vote to county councils, elected from multi-member electoral areas. Only one election was under the new system before independence, held in January 1920 (in urban areas) and on 2 June 1920 (in rural areas), during the Irish War of Independence.

==== 1922 to present ====
The Irish Free State inherited the local authorities created by the United Kingdom legislation. The first elections after independence were held on 23 June 1925, following amendments by the Local Government Act 1925. The act abolished rural district councils (except in County Dublin) and passed their powers to the county councils. At the following election all county councils were to be increased: the number of extra councillors was to be twice the number of abolished rural districts. The act set out the powers and duties of county councils and also gave the Minister for Local Government the power to dissolve councils if he was satisfied that "the duties of a local council are not being duly and effectually discharged". He could order new elections to be held, or transfer the power and properties of the council "to any body or persons or person he shall think fit". The power was widely used by ministers of all parties. For example, Kerry County Council was dissolved from 1930 to 1932, and from 1945 to 1948, with commissioners appointed to perform the council's function.

The number of county councils was increased from 27 to 29 in 1994 when County Dublin was split under the Local Government (Dublin) Act 1993 into three new counties: Dún Laoghaire–Rathdown, Fingal and South Dublin.

In 2014, under the Local Government Reform Act 2014, the number of county councils was again reduced: a merger of North Tipperary and South Tipperary County Councils created a single Tipperary County Council; and the city and county councils of Limerick and Waterford were merged to create Limerick City and County Council and Waterford City and County Council.

== Taiwan ==
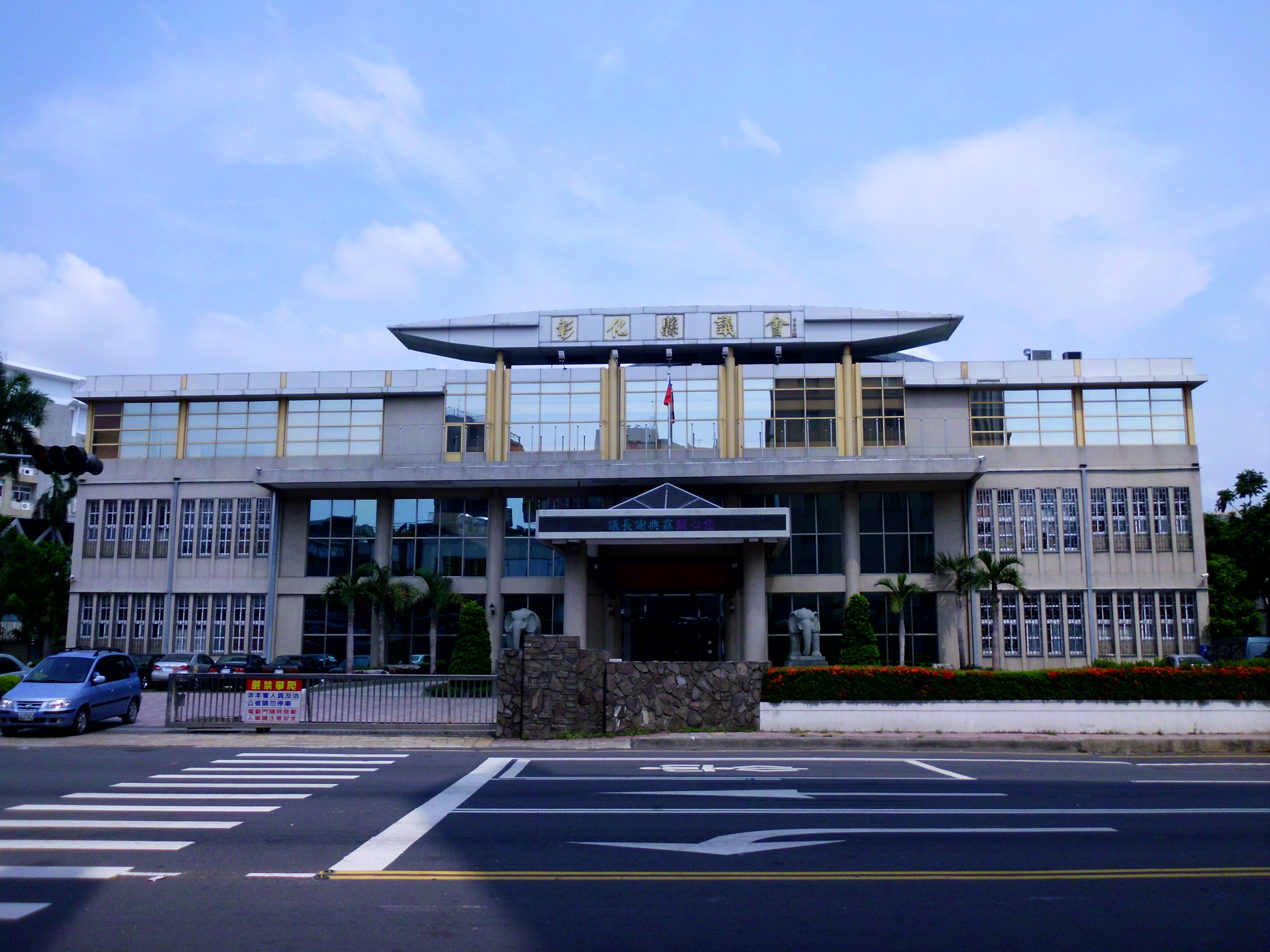
Changhua County Council building

In Taiwan, a county council is the legislative body of each county. Members of the councils are elected through local elections held every 4 years.

=== 1950 to 1999 ===
The Outline for Implementing Local Autonomy for Cities and Counties was promulgated in April 1950. County councils were established in 1951.

=== 1999 to present ===
In 1999 the Local Government Act was enacted. As stipulated in the Act, duties of the county councils include approving the county budget, levying local taxes and enacting local ordinances.

== United Kingdom ==
County councils were formed in the late 19th century. In the various constituent countries of the United Kingdom councils had different powers and different memberships. Following local government reforms in the 1970s, county councils no longer exist in Scotland or Northern Ireland. In England they generally form the top level in a two-tier system of administration; in Wales they are unitary authorities.

=== England ===
In England county councils were introduced in 1889, and reformed in 1974. Since the mid-1990s a series of local government reorganisations has reduced the number of county councils as unitary authorities have been established in a number of areas. County councils are very large employers with a great variety of functions including education (schools and youth services), social services, highways, fire and rescue services, libraries, waste disposal, consumer services and town and country planning. Until the 1990s they also ran colleges of further education and the careers services. That decade also saw the privatisation of some traditional services, such as highway maintenance, cleaning and school meals.

==== History ====
County councils were created by the Local Government Act 1888 (51 & 52 Vict. c. 41), largely taking over the administrative functions of the unelected county courts of quarter sessions. County councils consisted of councillors, directly elected by the electorate; and county aldermen, chosen by the council itself. There was one county alderman for every three councillors (one for every six in the London County Council). The first elections to the councils were held at various dates in January 1889, and they served as "provisional" or shadow councils until 1 April, when they came into their powers. Elections of all councillors and half of the aldermen took place every three years thereafter. The areas over which the councils had authority were designated as administrative counties. The writ of the county councils did not extend everywhere: large towns and some historic counties corporate were constituted county boroughs by the same act. County borough councils were independent of the council for the county in which they were geographically situated, and exercised the functions of both county and district councils. The new system was a major modernisation, which reflected the increasing range of functions carried out by local government in late Victorian Britain. A major accretion of powers took place when education was added to county council responsibilities in 1902. County councils were responsible for more strategic services in a region, with (from 1894) smaller urban district councils and rural district councils responsible for other activities. The Local Government Act 1929 considerably increased the powers of county councils. Primarily, the Boards of Guardians were abolished: workhouses were taken over by the county councils as public assistance institutions, and county councils also assumed responsibility for former poor law infirmaries, and fever hospitals. County councils also took charge of highways in rural districts.

In 1965 there was a reduction in the number of county councils. The London Government Act 1963 abolished those of London and Middlesex and created the Greater London Council. Greater London was declared to be an "area" and not to lie in any county. In addition two pairs of administrative counties were merged to become Cambridgeshire and Isle of Ely and Huntingdon and Peterborough under recommendations made by the Local Government Commission for England. The Local Government Act 1972 completely reorganised local authorities in England and Wales. County boroughs were abolished and the whole of England (apart from Greater London) was placed in a two-tier arrangement with county councils and district councils. In the six largest conurbations metropolitan county councils, with increased powers, were created. The post of county alderman was abolished, and the entire council was thereafter directly elected every four years. In 1986 the six metropolitan county councils were abolished, with their functions transferred to the metropolitan boroughs and joint boards. The Local Government Act 1992 established a new Local Government Commission whose remit was to conduct a review of the structure of local administration, and the introduction of unitary authorities where appropriate. Accordingly, the number of county councils was reduced: Avon, Berkshire, Cleveland, Hereford and Worcester and Humberside were abolished, while Worcestershire County Council was re-established. The reforms somewhat blurred the distinction between county and district council. The Isle of Wight county council became a unitary authority, renamed the "Isle of Wight Council". Conversely, two unitary district councils added the word "county" to their titles to become "Rutland County Council District Council" and "County of Herefordshire District Council".

==== 21st-century reforms ====
A further wave of local government reform took place in April 2009 under the Local Government and Public Involvement in Health Act 2007. Following invitations from central government in 2007, a number of county councils and their associated districts examined ways in which local government provision could be rationalised, mainly in the form of abolishing the existing county and district councils and establishing one-tier authorities for all or parts of these existing counties. As a result, the status of some of these (mainly) more rural counties changed. Cornwall, Durham, Northumberland, Shropshire and Wiltshire became unitary authorities providing all services. Some of these councils have dropped the word "county" from their titles. Bedfordshire and Cheshire county councils were abolished with more than one unitary council established within the boundaries of the abolished council. Other county councils remained unchanged, particularly in the heavily populated parts of England such as the south-east. Further minor local government reforms took place in 2019–20, which led to Dorset and Buckinghamshire also becoming unitary authorities providing all services.

=== Northern Ireland ===
County councils existed in Northern Ireland from 1922 to 1973.

Following partition, six administrative counties remained within the United Kingdom as part of Northern Ireland. Local government came under the control of the Parliament of Northern Ireland, who quickly introduced the Local Government Act (Northern Ireland) 1922, abolishing proportional representation. Electoral districts were redrawn, and a property qualification for voters (Plural voting) introduced, ensuring Unionist controlled councils in counties with Nationalist majorities. In 1968 Fermanagh County Council was reconstituted as a unitary authority. County councils were abolished under the Local Government Act (Northern Ireland) 1972 in 1973. The only local authorities since that date have been district councils.

=== Scotland ===
In Scotland county councils existed from 1890 to 1975. They were created by the Local Government (Scotland) Act 1889 and reconstituted forty years later by the Local Government (Scotland) Act 1929. County councils were abolished in 1975 when a system of large regional councils was introduced. Regions were themselves abolished in 1996 and replaced by the current unitary council areas.

==== History ====
In Scotland, control of county administration was in the hands of Commissioners of Supply. This was a body of the principal landowners liable to pay land tax, and was unelected. The first elections to Scottish county councils took place in February 1890. Only the councillors for the "landward" part of the county were elected however. The remainder of the council were co-opted by the town councils of the burghs in the county. Scottish county councils also differed from those in England and Wales as they were required to divide their county into districts. A district committee of the county councillors elected for the area were an independent local council for some administrative purposes.

In 1930 the Scottish county councils were completely reconstituted. Their powers were increased in small burghs. On the other hand, large burghs became independent of the county for most purposes. The district committees created in 1890 were abolished and replaced by district councils, partly consisting of county councillors and partly of directly elected district councillors. Two joint county councils were created, for Perthshire and Kinross-shire and Moray and Nairnshire. The county councils also gained the duties of the abolished education authorities.

=== Wales ===
Since 1996 Wales has been divided into unitary principal areas. Principal councils were designated by the legislation that created them as either "county councils" or "county borough councils". County and county borough councils have identical powers.

=== History ===
Prior to 1996 local government in Wales was similar to that in England. Thus the county councils introduced in 1889 were identical to their English counterparts. The Local Government Commission for Wales appointed under the Local Government Act 1958 recommended a reduction in the number of county councils in Wales and Monmouthshire from thirteen to seven, but reform did not take place until 1974.

From 1 April 1974 the number of counties and county councils was reduced to eight in number. Like the county councils introduced in England at the same time, the whole council was elected every four years. There was a slightly different division of powers between county and district councils, however. The county and district councils were abolished twenty-two years later, when the present system of principal areas was introduced.

== United States ==
A county council is a type of local government that is responsible for providing services to a specific county or region. It is typically composed of elected officials who are responsible for making decisions about the county's budget, infrastructure, and services. County councils are responsible for providing services such as education, health care, public safety, transportation, and social services. They also have the power to levy taxes and fees to fund these services. County councils are typically responsible for maintaining roads, bridges, and other infrastructure within their county. They also have the power to pass laws and regulations that affect the county. County councils are typically responsible for providing services to their constituents, such as libraries, parks, and other recreational facilities. County councils are also responsible for providing services to the elderly, disabled, and other vulnerable populations. County councils are typically responsible for providing services to the environment, such as water and air quality, and for protecting natural resources. County councils are also responsible for providing services to businesses, such as economic development and job training.

== Other countries ==
The term county council is sometimes used in English for regional municipal bodies in other countries.

- County Councils of Sweden (landsting)
- County councils of Romania (consilii județene)

Both Swedish and Norwegian county councils are directly elected by their inhabitants as it is also the case in Romania during local elections. There are some differences between them in responsibilities.
