= Local Government Board for Ireland =

Agency of the UK administration in Ireland, 1872 to independence

The Local Government Board for Ireland was an agency of the Dublin Castle administration that liaised with the various local authorities in Ireland. It was created in 1872 and lasted until partition in 1921–22.

== History ==
The board was created under the Local Government Board (Ireland) Act 1872, mirroring the Local Government Board created for England and Wales in 1871. Upon its establishment, the board took over the functions of the Irish Poor Law Commissioners with respect to Boards of Guardians of Poor Law Unions, and also dealt with urban municipal government (town commissioners and borough corporations). Its headquarters were in the Custom House, Dublin. There were five board members: two political ex-officio members, the Chief Secretary for Ireland (who was president) and the Under-Secretary for Ireland; and three permanent technocratic members, including the vice-president and the medical commissioner (a qualified physician for addressing public health issues). The first three permanent members were the three final Poor Law Commissioners. Generally the vice-president was in effective charge with the political members absent; but in Arthur Balfour's presidency there were tensions. Dublin Castle tried to maintain a balance of Catholic and Protestant board members.

The Congested Districts Board for Ireland was set up separately in 1891 to deal specifically with areas with large numbers of small uneconomic farms.

After the Local Government (Ireland) Act 1898, the Local Government Board dealt with the new county and district councils, including the initial recommendations for county boundary adjustments under the 1898 act. Many local councils were nationalist-controlled and these frequently resented the board, regarding it as bureaucratic and imperialist.

== Supersession ==
County and district councils controlled by Sinn Féin after the 1920 local elections bypassed the Local Government Board in favour of the self-proclaimed Irish Republic's Department of Local Government, with W. T. Cosgrave as Minister. On 25 May 1921, near the end of the Republic's guerrilla war, the Custom House was burned out by Dublin Brigade of the Irish Republican Army, destroying most of the board's records.

On the establishment of Northern Ireland in 1921, the board's functions in that jurisdiction were transferred to the Department of Home Affairs in 1921 (and thereafter to the Department of Health and Local Government on its creation in 1944).

In the Irish Free State, the Ministers and Secretaries Act 1924 assigned the board's functions to the Department of Local Government and Public Health (named the Department of Housing, Local Government and Heritage since 2020), which has remained in the Custom House.
