= Local Government Act 2001 =

Legislation restructuring local government in Ireland

Oireachtas
- Long title: AN ACT TO MAKE FURTHER AND BETTER PROVISION IN RELATION TO LOCAL GOVERNMENT AND, IN PARTICULAR, TO CONSOLIDATE WITH AMENDMENTS CERTAIN ENACTMENTS RELATING GENERALLY TO LOCAL AUTHORITIES.
- Citation: No. 37 of 2001
- Signed: 21 July 2001
- Commenced: Various dates

Legislative history
- Bill citation: No. 23 of 2000
- Introduced by: Minister for Environment and Local Government (Noel Dempsey)
- Introduced: 4 May 2000

Amended by
- Local Government Reform Act 2014

The Local Government Act 2001 (No. 37) was enacted by the Oireachtas on 21 July 2001 to reform local government in Ireland. Most of the provisions of the Act came into operation on 1 January 2002. The act was a restatement and amendment of previous legislation, which was centred on the Local Government (Ireland) Act 1898. The 2001 act remains in force, although significantly amended by the Local Government Reform Act 2014.

According to the explanatory memorandum issued before the passing of the Act, its purposes were to:

- enhance the role of the elected member,
- support community involvement with local authorities in a more participative local democracy,
- modernise local government legislation, and provide the framework for new financial management systems and other procedures to promote efficiency and effectiveness,
- underpin generally the programme of local government renewal.

== Local government areas ==
The act established local government areas based on those already created by previous legislation. The types of areas listed in the act are:

Counties: Identical to the administrative counties established by the Local Government (Ireland) Act 1898 and modified by later legislation. The opportunity was taken to rename Tipperary (North Riding) and Tipperary (South Riding) as North Tipperary and South Tipperary respectively.

Cities: These were the county boroughs created by the 1898 act and later legislation, renamed. All the county boroughs except Galway had previously had the courtesy title of city by charter or letters patent.

Boroughs: The five existing non-county boroughs continued in existence. In addition, it was recognised that Kilkenny could continue to be called a city, in spite of being governed by a borough council and not being a former county borough.

Towns: The remaining town authorities, formerly known as urban districts or towns with town commissioners, were all redesignated as towns.

== Local authorities ==
A council was established for each of the local government areas with the title county council, city council, borough council, or town council (as appropriate).

== Membership of councils ==
One of the most controversial proposals in the bill was the abolition of the dual mandate. This would meant that members of the Oireachtas (Dáil Éireann and Seanad Éireann) could no longer be candidates for local authority elections. This was taken out of the original bill after protests from Fianna Fáil backbenchers who were also councillors. It was subsequently inserted into the 2001 Act by a 2003 amendment after a compensation package had been agreed.

=== Directly-elected mayors ===
Inspired by the creation in the United Kingdom of the office of Mayor of London in 2000, Chapter 3 of Part 5 of the 2001 act as passed provided for a directly elected chairperson (mayor or cathaoirleach) of each county and city council. This was to take effect from the 2004 local elections. However, a 2003 amendment repealed the provision before it was implemented.

== Local Government Commission ==
Part 11 of the Act mandated the establishment of a permanent Local Government Commission to propose changes to local authority areas, local electoral areas, or local authority powers. This part never came into force and was repealed by the 2014 act. The previous practice of ad hoc committees for boundary reviews continued after 2001 and was formalised by the 2014 act.
