= Local Government (Ireland) Act 1898 =

Act of the Parliament of the United Kingdom establishing local government in Ireland

Local Government (Ireland) Act 1898 (Note: Section 110(1).)
- Act of Parliament
- Parliament of the United Kingdom
- Long title: An Act for amending the Law relating to Local Government in Ireland, and for other purposes connected therewith.
- Citation: 61 & 62 Vict. c. 37
- Introduced by: Gerald Balfour (Commons)
- Territorial extent: United Kingdom

Dates
- Royal assent: 12 August 1898
- Commencement: 25 March 1899; 1 April 1899 (Note: Section 124(1). Provisions relating to rural districts and poor law unions commenced 25 March 1899. The dates for some other provisions were varied by order.)
Other legislation
Repeals/revokes	Lighting of Towns (Ireland) Act 1828
Amended by	Post Office Act 1908; Representation of the People Act 1918; Representation of the People Act 1949; Statute Law Revision Act 1963; [[[Northern Ireland (Lieutenancy) Order 1975]]; Judicature (Northern Ireland) Act 1978

Status: Amended

History of passage through Parliament

Text of statute as originally enacted

The Local Government (Ireland) Act 1898 (61 & 62 Vict. c. 37) is an act of the Parliament of the United Kingdom that established a system of local government in Ireland similar to that already created for England and Wales by the Local Government Act 1888 (51 & 52 Vict. c. 41) and for Scotland by the Local Government (Scotland) Act 1889 (52 & 53 Vict. c. 50). The act effectively ended landlord control of local government in Ireland.

== Background ==
From the 1880s the issue of local government reform in Ireland was a major political issue, involving both Irish politicians and the major British political parties. Questions of constitutional reform, land ownership and nationalism all combined to complicate matters, as did splits in both the Liberal Party in 1886 and the Irish Parliamentary Party in 1891. Eventually, the Conservative government of Lord Salisbury found it politically expedient to introduce the measures in 1898.

The legislation was seen by the government as solving a number of problems: it softened demands for home rule from Nationalists, it eased the burden of agricultural rates on Unionist landlords, it created a more efficient poor law administration and it strengthened the Union by bringing English forms of local government to Ireland.

== The existing system and earlier attempts at reform ==
=== Counties and baronies ===
Each county and county corporate of Ireland was administered before the Local Government (Ireland) Act 1898 by a grand jury. These bodies were made up of major landowners appointed by the assizes judge of the county. As well as their original judicial functions the grand juries had taken on the maintenance of roads, bridges and asylums and the supervision of other public works. The grand jury made proposals for expenditure known as "presentments" which required the approval of the assizes judge. The money to pay for the presentments was raised by a "county cess" levied on landowners and occupiers in the county, a form of rate tax. A second tier of administrative division below the county was the barony. A similar system operated at this level, with the justices of the area empowered to meet in baronial presentment sessions to raise a cess to fund minor works.

By 1880 the members of the grand juries and baronial sessions were still overwhelmingly Unionist and Protestant, and therefore totally unrepresentative of the majority of the population of the areas they governed. This was because they had represented and were chosen from the actual taxpayers since the Middle Ages, and retiring members were normally replaced by similar taxpayers from the same social class. The understanding was that larger taxpayers had a greater motive to see that the tax money was spent properly. The Representation of the People Act 1884 created a much larger electorate that had very different needs and inevitably wanted to elect local representatives from outside a narrow social élite. By now public works such as roads and bridges were being funded increasingly by central government via the Office of Public Works.

=== Poor law unions and sanitary districts ===
In 1838 Ireland was divided into poor law unions (PLUs), each consisting of a geographical area based on a workhouse. The union boundaries did not correspond to those of any existing unit, with many rural areas crossing into two or more counties. The unions were administered by boards of guardians. The boards were in part directly elected, with one guardian elected for each electoral division.

With the growth of population a need to create authorities to administer public health and provide or regulate such services as sewerage, paving and water supply arose. The Public Health (Ireland) Act 1878 created sanitary districts, based on the system already existing in England and Wales. Larger towns (municipal boroughs and towns with commissioners under private acts or with a population of 6,000 or more) were created urban sanitary districts: the existing local council became the urban sanitary authority. The remainder of the country was divided into rural sanitary districts. These were identical in area to poor law unions (less any part in an urban sanitary district), and the rural sanitary authority consisted of the poor law guardians for the area.

=== Proposed changes 1888–1892 ===
The first proposals for elected county councils in Ireland were made by the Radical-Liberal Minister Joseph Chamberlain to Prime Minister William Ewart Gladstone in 1885. The electorate had been enlarged by the recent Representation of the People Act 1884. Gladstone and Charles Stewart Parnell, leader of the Irish National League, preferred to legislate for Irish Home Rule. However, the First Home Rule Bill was defeated in the House of Commons in 1886. Chamberlain, briefly the President of the Local Government Board in 1886, then left the Liberals to form the Liberal Unionist Party and brought the proposal to his new Conservative allies, who won the 1886 United Kingdom general election shortly afterwards.

In 1888 Chamberlain again called for democratically elected county councils in Ireland, as a part of a crash programme of state-funded public works, in his book A Unionist Policy for Ireland.

Directly elected county councils were introduced to England and Wales by the Local Government Act 1888 and to Scotland by the Local Government (Scotland) Act 1889. Attempts to bring about similar reforms in Ireland were delayed because of the civil unrest caused by the Plan of Campaign. The government argued that before they could bring in administrative reforms, law and order should be restored. Accordingly, Arthur Balfour, the Chief Secretary for Ireland, introduced coercion acts to end the "agrarian outrages". Unionists, increasingly losing seats to members of the Irish National League at elections of guardians, also sought to delay implementation.

Balfour announced on 10 August 1891 that local government legislation would be introduced in the next parliamentary session. The announcement was met with protests from Unionists and landlords who predicted that the new authorities would be disloyal and would monopolise their power to drive them out of the country. Balfour, despite the opposition, made it clear that he intended to proceed. With the Irish Parliamentary Party split into "Parnellite" and "anti-Parnellite" factions, he was encouraged to believe that the bill could be used to destroy the demand for Home Rule and further splinter the Nationalist movement.

When the bill was introduced to Parliament early in 1892, it was clear that the Unionists had successfully watered down many of its provisions by securing safeguards on their hold on local government. The provisions of the proposed legislation were:

- County and district councils, elected on the parliamentary franchise
- Transfer of powers of grand juries over roads and sanitation to the new councils
- Administration of local revenues and setting of county cess to be decided by the majority of ratepayers

The "safeguards" to protect the Unionist minority were:

- Electors to have "cumulative votes" with those paying more cess having more votes
- Any ratepayer could challenge the council presentment before a judge and jury
- County and district councils could be dismissed for "disobedience to the law, corruption or consistent malversion and oppression"
- A joint committee of councillors and grand jurors was to approve all capital expenditure and appointment of officers.

The bill was rejected by almost all Irish parliamentarians, with the support of only a handful of Ulster Liberal Unionists. While Balfour hoped to make the legislation acceptable by tabling amendments, this was rejected by Nationalists who hoped to see a change to a pro-Home Rule Liberal administration at the imminent general election. The bill was accordingly abandoned.

== Gerald Balfour as Chief Secretary and the crisis of 1897 ==
Following three years of Liberal government, the Conservative–Liberal Unionist coalition formed a Unionist government following the 1895 general election. Gerald Balfour, brother of Arthur, and nephew of the new Prime Minister, Lord Salisbury, was appointed Chief Secretary for Ireland on 4 July 1895. He soon made his mark when he summarised the Irish policy of the new government as "killing home rule with kindness". The British Government passed three major pieces of Irish legislation in four years: apart from the Local Government (Ireland) Act 1898, these were the Land Law (Ireland) Act 1896 (59 & 60 Vict. c. 47) and the Agriculture and Technical Instruction (Ireland) Act 1899 (62 & 63 Vict. c. 50).

The local government legislation was not originally part of the government's programme announced in the Queen's Speech of January 1897. It was also exceptional in that there was almost no popular demand for the reforms. It thus came as a complete surprise when Chief Secretary Balfour announced in May that he was preparing legislation. While he claimed that the extension to Ireland of the local government reforms already carried out in Great Britain had always been intended, the sudden conversion to the "alternative policy" was in fact a way of solving a political crisis at Westminster. Obstruction by Irish members of parliament and a number of English MPs was causing a legislative backlog. Landlords, already angered by the Land Law (Ireland) Act 1896, were enraged by the refusal of the Treasury to extend the agricultural rating grant to Ireland. In fact, the failure to introduce the grant was largely due to there being no effective local government system to administer it. Instead, an equivalent sum had been given to the Dublin Castle administration, who had decided to use the money to fund poor law reform and a new Agricultural Board. On 18 May the Irish Unionist MPs wrote to the government informing them that they would withdraw their support unless the rating grant was introduced.

The Lord Lieutenant of Ireland, Lord Cadogan, held talks with the Treasury and hit upon the idea of introducing the local government reforms as a way to "break up a combination of unionists with nationalists in Ireland" which he felt was "becoming too strong for even for a ministry with a majority of 150!" The introduction of democratic county councils along with a substantial rates subsidy was felt to be sure to placate all Irish members of the house. The government moved quickly, sending a copy of the English Local Government Act 1888 (51 & 52 Vict. c. 41) to Sir Henry Robinson, vice-president of the Local Government Board for Ireland. Robinson, who was on holiday, was instructed to decide how much of the existing legislation could be speedily adapted for Irish use. Within a week came the announcement that a bill was to be prepared.

Local Government (Application of Enactments) Order 1898
- Statutory Rules and Orders
- Parliament of the United Kingdom
- Citation: SR&O 1899/1120
- Territorial extent: Ireland

Dates
- Made: 22 December 1898
Other legislation
Made under	Local Government (Ireland) Act 1898

Records of Parliamentary debate relating to the statute from Hansard

There would not be enough time in a single parliamentary session to debate all planned measures, so an omnibus power was granted to Lord Lieutenant to pass Orders in Council adapting previous acts to Ireland, including parts of the (English) Municipal Corporations Act 1882 (45 & 46 Vict. c. 50) and the Municipal Corporations Act 1893 (56 & 57 Vict. c. 9), as well as the Local Government Act 1888, the Local Government Act 1894 (56 & 57 Vict. c. 73), and the Local Government (Scotland) Act 1889 (52 & 53 Vict. c. 50). This use of secondary legislation – the Local Government (Application of Enactments) Order 1898 (SR&O 1899/1120) – rather than primary legislation was controversial, but Irish nationalists accepted it as the price of getting the bill passed.

== The reforms ==
The political situation after the ensuing 1899 Irish local elections, showing results for the county council elections by electoral division.

The 1898 act brought in a mixed system of government, with county boroughs independent of county administration, and elsewhere a two-tier system with county councils, along with borough, urban and rural district councils. Urban districts were created from the larger of the town commissioners towns, while the smaller towns retained their town commissioners, but remained in the rural districts for sanitary planning purposes.

The creation of the new councils had a significant effect on Ireland as it allowed a much larger number of local people to take decisions affecting themselves. The county and the sub-county district councils created a political platform for proponents of Home Rule, displacing Unionist influence in many areas. The enfranchisement of local electors allowed the development of a new political class, creating a significant body of experienced politicians who would enter national politics in Ireland in the 1920s, and increase the stability of the transitions to the parliaments of the Irish Free State and Northern Ireland.

== County and county borough boundaries ==
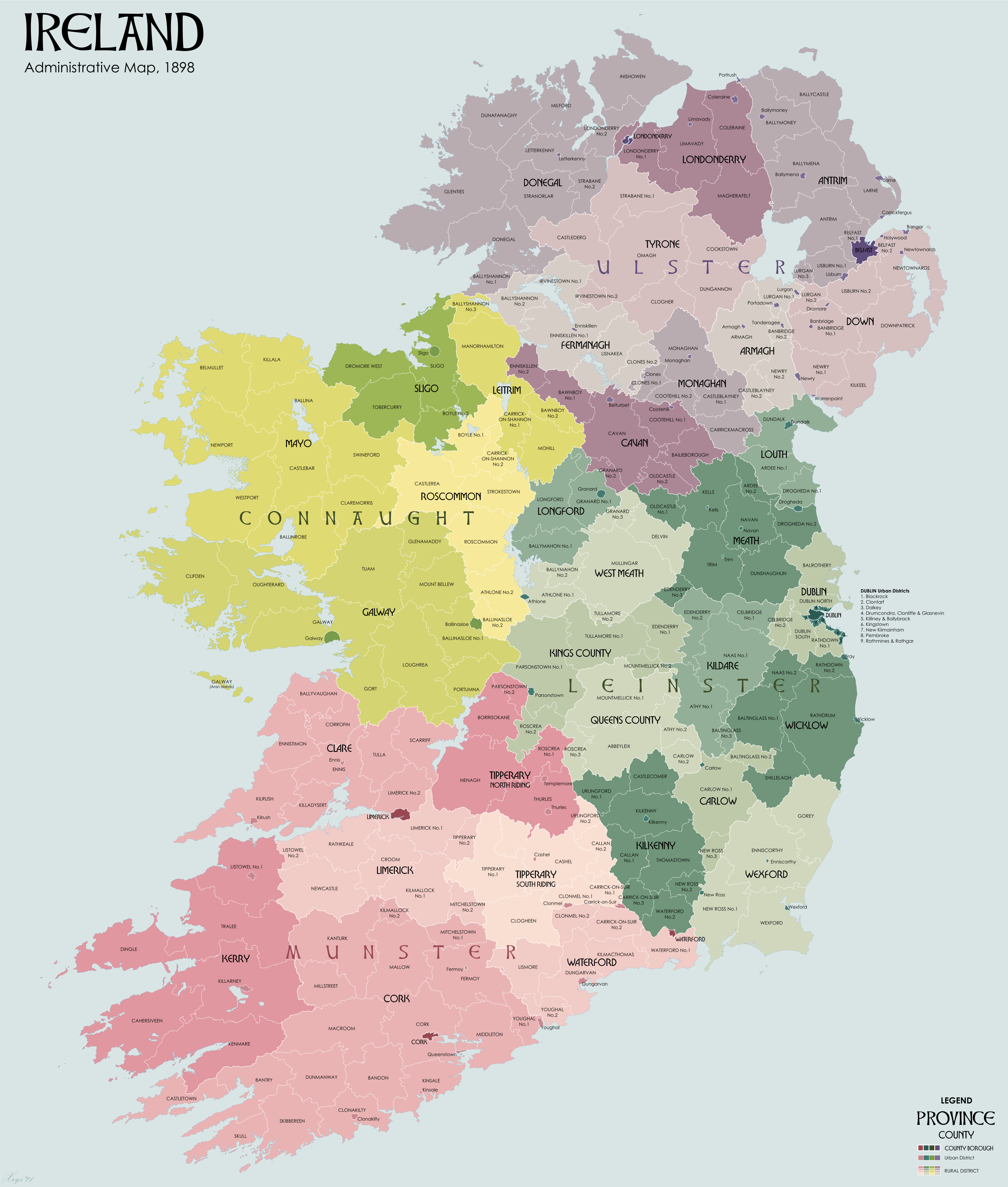
Map of counties and county districts (urban and rural) after 1899.

The Act led to the modification of a number of county boundaries. This was for several reasons:

- Each county district had to be in a single county, unlike the sanitary districts on which they were based
  - Where an urban sanitary district lay in more than one county, the new urban district would be placed entirely within that in which the majority of the population lay.
  - Where a poor law union (PLU) lay in more than one county, generally a rural district was created for the fraction each county (for example, Ballyshannon PLU was split into Ballyshannon No. 1, No. 2, and No. 3 rural districts in counties Donegal, Fermanagh, and Leitrim respectively). Boundaries were adjusted if one fraction was too small or otherwise impractical.
- The eight old counties corporate did not correspond to the six new county boroughs.
  - The cities of Belfast and Derry were separated from the counties in which they lay and constituted as separate county boroughs.
  - Four counties corporate were merged into their parent counties.

The extents of the new administrative counties and county boroughs, which came into effect on 18 April 1899, were defined by orders of the Local Government Board for Ireland. There were no changes to the boundaries of the counties of Cavan, Cork, Donegal, Fermanagh, Kerry, Kildare, King's County (now Offaly), Leitrim, Limerick, Longford, Meath, Monaghan, and Tyrone; nor to those of the county boroughs (previously counties corporate) of Cork, Dublin, Limerick, and Waterford. Changes elsewhere were as follows:

Pre-1898 judicial county	Post-1898 administrative county	Area transferred	Type of transfer
Antrim	Belfast county borough	Belfast city (part)	New county borough
Armagh	Down	Newry town (part)	urban
Carrickfergus (county of the town)	Antrim	All	Abolished corporate county
Down	Antrim	Lisburn town (part)	urban
Down	Belfast county borough	Belfast city (part)	New county borough
Drogheda (county of the town)	Louth	All	Abolished corporate county
Dublin	Wicklow	Bray township (part)	urban
Galway	Clare	Drummaan, Inishcaltra North and Mountshannon EDs (Note: This area is on the north-western shore of Lough Derg.)	rural
Galway	Mayo	Ballinchalla, Owenbrin EDs (Note: These areas lay on the western shore of Lough Mask, and were remote from the rest of Galway.)	rural
Galway	Roscommon	Rosmoylan ED	rural
Galway (county of the town)	Galway	All	Abolished corporate county
Kilkenny	Wexford	New Ross town (part)	urban
Kilkenny (county of the city)	Kilkenny	All	Abolished corporate county
Londonderry (Note: See Derry/Londonderry name dispute)	Londonderry county borough	Londonderry (Derry) city	New county borough
Queen's County (now Laois)	Carlow	Carlow town (part)	urban
Mayo	Roscommon	Ballaghaderreen, Edmondstown EDs	rural
Roscommon	Galway	Ballinasloe town (part)	urban
Roscommon	Westmeath	Athlone town (part)	urban
Sligo	Mayo	Ardnaree North, Ardnaree South Rural, Ardnaree South Urban EDs (Note: These areas were adjacent to the Mayo town of Ballina.)	rural
Tipperary, North Riding	Tipperary, South Riding	Cappagh, Curraheen, Glengar EDs	rural
Waterford	Kilkenny	Kilculliheen ED	rural
Waterford	Tipperary, South Riding	Carrick-on-Suir town (part); Clonmel borough (part)	urban

== Subsequent developments ==
Boundaries of Irish county constituencies at Westminster were not adjusted by the 1898 act to align with the new administrative boundaries. Some were aligned by the Representation of the People Act 1918 (7 & 8 Geo. 5. c. 64), where the county divisions were being altered for other reasons; for example Kilculliheen was transferred from Waterford City to South Kilkenny, but Ardnaree remained in North Sligo rather than East Mayo.

Under the Local Government (Ireland) Act 1919 (9 & 10 Geo. 5. c. 19), the electoral system for local elections in Ireland was changed to single transferable vote (STV) in multi-member districts. This had been used in the election to Sligo Corporation in 1919 (provided under separate local legislation), and then for the 1920 Irish local elections. After the partition of Ireland in 1920–22, the situation evolved differently in the Irish Free State (Ireland from 1937, Republic of Ireland from 1949) and Northern Ireland.

In the Irish Free State, rural districts were abolished by the Local Government Act 1925 (they remained in County Dublin until abolished under the Local Government (Dublin) Act 1930). Urban districts were renamed "towns" by the Local Government Act 2001. The 2001 Act also renamed "county borough corporations" as "city councils". The introduction of a council–manager system in 1929–40 significantly changed the operation of county and city councils. The Local Government Reform Act 2014 abolished the tier of boroughs and towns within county areas and divided all counties (except those in County Dublin) into municipal districts. As of 17 July 2024 the unrepealed parts of the 1898 Act in the Republic are sections 6(a), 8, 29, 52, 54, 69(1)–(2), 80, 89, 101(2), 101(4), 102(1)–(3), 109, 110(1), 110(2)(a), and 124, and Schedule 1 parts 3 and 4.

In Northern Ireland, STV was abolished in 1922. The two-tier county–district system was retained until the Local Government Act (Northern Ireland) 1972 replaced it with a system of 26 unitary districts from 1973. Some elected councils had been dissolved in the 1960s as tensions grew in the buildup to the Troubles. As of 2001 the unrepealed sections of the 1898 Act in Northern Ireland were 4, 10, 11, 21, 27, 29, 31, 36, 37, 41, 69, 72, 78, 82, 83, 108–110, and 124.

Section 73 of the act was repealed by section 1 of, and the schedule to, the Statute Law Revision Act 1963, which came into force on 31 July 1963.

== See also ==
- List of Irish local government areas 1898–1921
- Local government in the Republic of Ireland
- List of rural and urban districts in Northern Ireland

== Bibliography ==
Primary

- Local Government Board for Ireland (1900). Twenty-seventh report. Command papers. Vol. C.9480. Dublin: Alex. Thom for HMSO. §§1–7 and Appendices A.
- Irish Statute Book:
  - "Local Government (Ireland) Act 1898". 2nd revised edition of the statutes. 1909.
  - "British Public Statutes Affected: 1898". Pre-1922 Acts amendments. 19 January 2017. Local Government (Ireland) Act 1898.
  - "Local Government (Application of Enactments) Order, 1898".
  - "Local Government (Adaptation of Irish Enactments) Order, 1899".
- Other:
  - Orders by Lord Lieutenant in Council, and Orders, Rules and Schedules by Local Government Board for Ireland, under Local Government and Registration (Ireland) Acts, 1898. Parliamentary papers. Vol. HC 1899 lxxxiii Pt II (360). London: HMSO. 8 August 1899.
  - Index to Orders and Rules under Local Government and Registration (Ireland) Acts, 1898. Parliamentary papers. Vol. HC 1900 lxxiii (360) 1065. London: HMSO. 7 August 1900.

Secondary

- Clancy, John Joseph (1899). A handbook of local government in Ireland; containing an explanatory introduction to the Local Government (Ireland) Act, 1898 : together with the text of the act, the orders in Council, and the rules made thereunder relating to county council, rural district council, and guardian's elections : with an index. Dublin: Sealy, Bryers and Walker.
- Gailey, Andrew (May 1984). "Unionist Rhetoric and Irish Local Government Reform, 1895–9". Irish Historic Studies. 24 (93): 52–68. doi:10.1017/S0021121400034027. JSTOR 30008026. S2CID 159923053.
- Robinson, Henry Augustus (1923). "Local Government Reform (1898)". Memories: wise and otherwise. London. pp. 124–136.
