= 1920 Irish local elections =

Local authority elections in Ireland

- January & June 1920

All 1806 councillors across Ireland
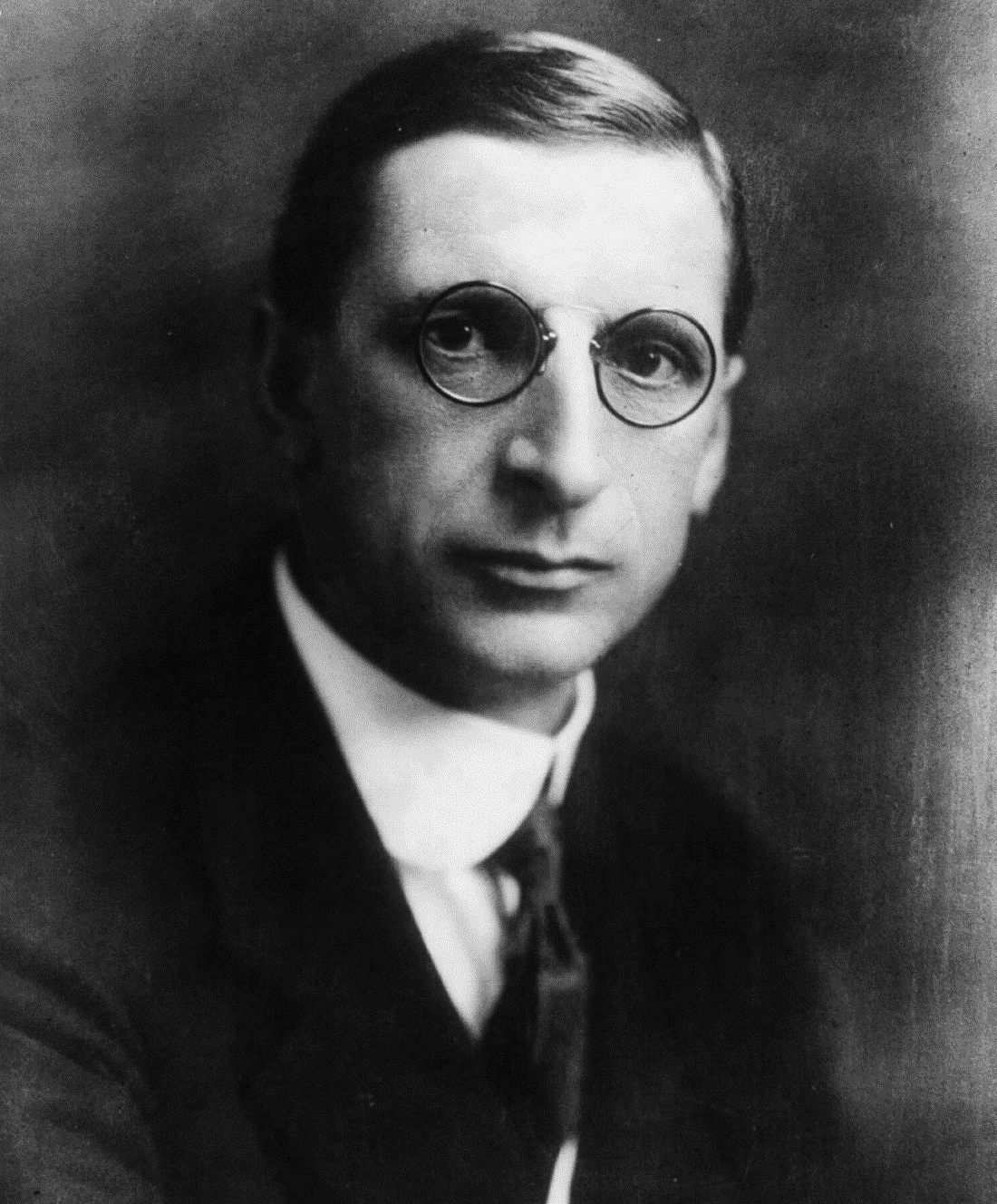

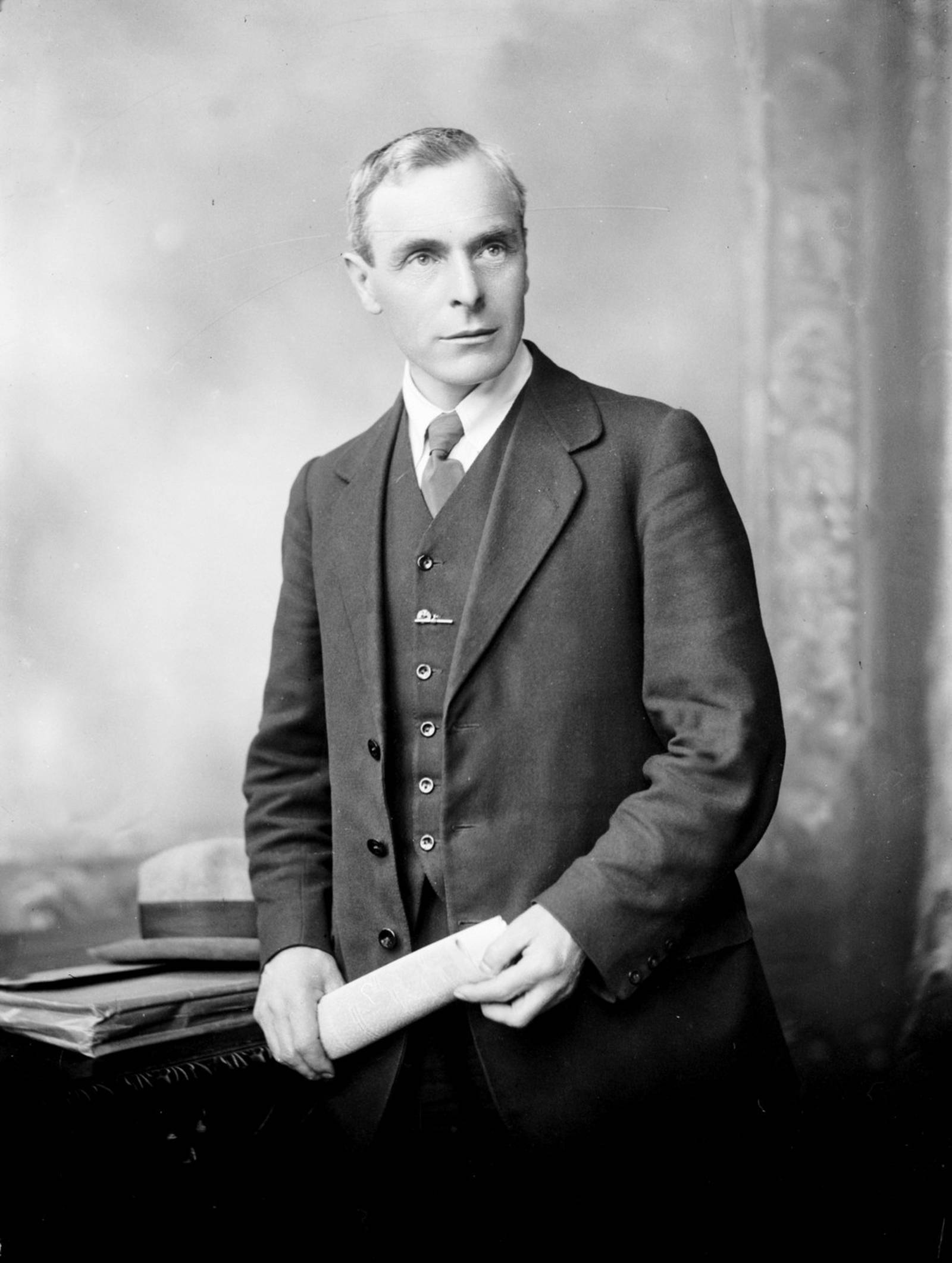

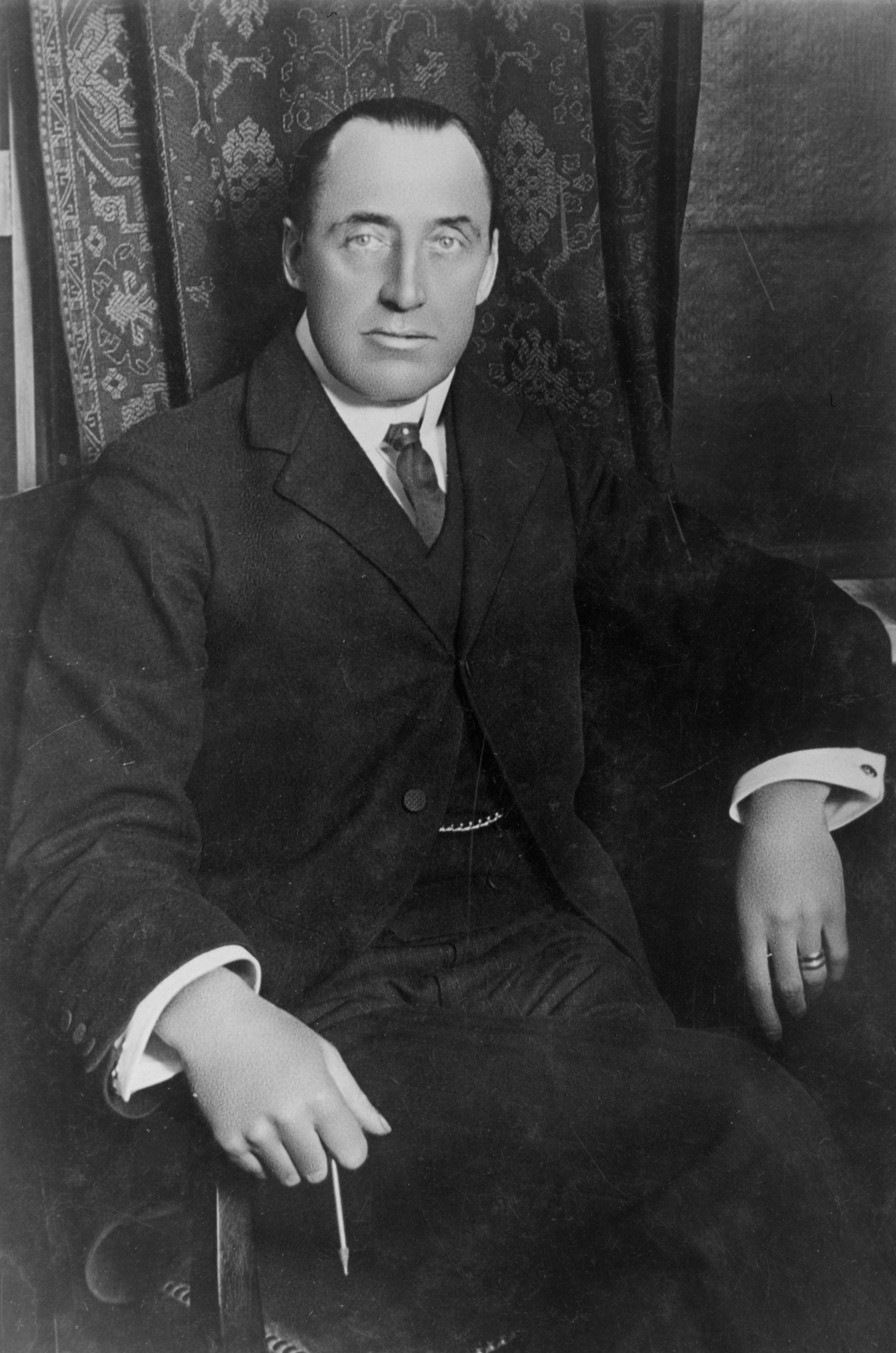
	First party	Second party	Third party
Leader	Éamon de Valera	Thomas Johnson	Edward Carson
Party	Sinn Féin	Labour	Irish Unionist
Councillors	550	394	355

Elections were held in January and June 1920 for the various county and district councils of Ireland. The elections were organised by the Dublin Castle administration under the law of the United Kingdom of Great Britain and Ireland (UK), and held while the Irish War of Independence was pitting UK forces against those of the Irish Republic proclaimed in 1919 by the Dáil Éireann.

Elections were held in two stages: borough and urban district councils in January; and county and rural district councils in June. Sinn Féin, which had established the First Dáil, won control of many of the councils, which subsequently broke contact with Dublin Castle's Local Government Board for Ireland and instead recognised the republican Department of Local Government.

The election results provide historians with a barometer of public opinion in what would be the last elections administered on an all-island basis: the Government of Ireland Act 1920 passed at the end of the year effected the partition of Ireland from 1921, though the elections for the two home rule Parliaments envisaged by it were held on the same day; no further elections would be held simultaneously across the island of Ireland until 1979, when representatives of the Republic of Ireland and Northern Ireland to the European Parliament were elected.

The next local elections were held in 1924 in Northern Ireland and in 1925 in the Irish Free State.

== Background ==
In the 1918 general elections the newly reformed Sinn Féin party had secured a large majority of Irish seats in the Parliament of the United Kingdom. Many of the seats won by Sinn Féin were uncontested and thus were secured by acclamation. Where the seats were contested, the elections used the first-past-the-post voting system. Those two reasons explain how the Sinn Féin took a majority of seats in the chamber even though in the districts where the seat was contested the party received less than half the vote. Sinn Féin's electoral success was a propaganda coup for the party, so the British Government introduced the Local Government (Ireland) Act 1919, which allowed for municipal elections by proportional representation in all of Ireland for the first time, by the system of the single transferable vote in multi-member districts. The Bill's second reading debate and vote were on 24 March. The government hoped that the new system would reveal less-than-monolithic support for Sinn Féin, and it was first tested in the 1920 local elections.

Some Sinn Féin members including Arthur Griffith had also helped to form the Proportional Representation Society of Ireland in the different circumstances of 1911. By 1920 the party was in a far stronger electoral position, and had no reason to oppose proportional representation, and it treated these elections as internal Irish elections for local authorities that were expected to swear allegiance to the new Irish Republic.

STV, the electoral system introduced by the 1919 Act, is still used today in elections in the Republic of Ireland and most elections in Northern Ireland.

== January 1920 ==
The 1919 act mandated elections for all urban councils except Sligo Corporation, which had been reconstituted and elected in 1919. The cumulative first preference votes in the 1920 urban elections were:

Party	% votes
Sinn Féin	27
Unionists	27
Labour Party	18
Other Irish nationalists	15
Independents	14

Excluding the more unionist province of Ulster, the urban results were:

Party	% votes
Sinn Féin	41
Independents	21
Labour Party	17
Other nationalists	14
Unionists	7

The 15 January elections saw Sinn Féin, Labour, and other nationalists winning control of 172 of Ireland's 206 borough and urban district councils. The subsequent mayoral elections on 30 January saw a Unionist elected for Belfast, a Nationalist in Derry, Labour in Wexford, and Sinn Féin in eight boroughs.

Turnout and uncontested areas
	County boroughs	Other boroughs	Urban districts	Town commissioners	Total
Electorate	293,410	13,367	154,632	13,583	474,992
Votes	198,487	9,968	112,844	10,204	331,503
Turnout %	67.7	74.6	73.0	75.1	69.8
Spoilt %	2.57	2.82	3.03	4.51	2.79
Electoral areas	40	12	204	39	295
Candidates	637	150	2,023	315	3,125
Seats	308	84	1,148	195	1,735
Uncontested areas	1	2	21	12	36

In Westport, only 4 candidates were nominated for the 18 seats on the urban district council, and only 2 of those accepted office. Since 5 councillors was a quorum, Mayo County Council mandated a special election for 15 March, but only one extra candidate was nominated.

== June 1920 ==
The rural elections showed a much greater level of support for Sinn Féin in its core support area. It took control of 338 out of 393 local government bodies, county councils, boards of guardians and rural district councils across the whole island. The county and rural district elections saw virtually no contests outside of Ulster.

Sinn Féin's success gave them dominance in virtually every county council and rural district council outside of Ulster. Sinn Féin success in 12 June rural and county elections extended even to Ulster, with the party winning control of 36 of Ulsters 55 rural districts.

== Results ==
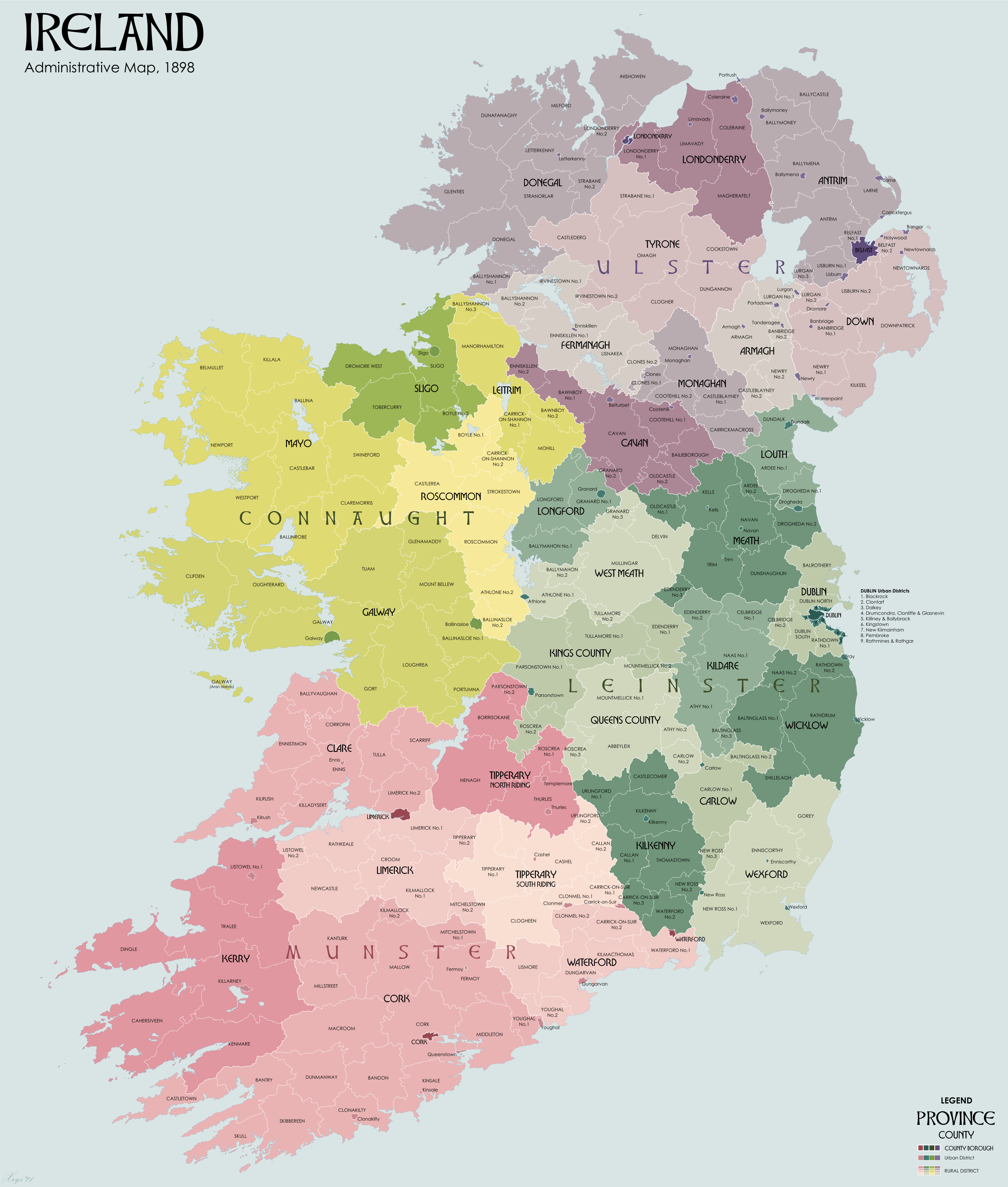
Map of Ireland's various county, urban, and rural district councils.

Party	Councillors	±	First Pref. votes	FPv%	±%
Sinn Féin	550				
Labour	394				
Irish Unionist	355				
Irish Nationalist	238				
Independent	161				
Municipal Reform & Ratepayers	108				
Totals	1806			100%	—
Source: Michael Laffan

=== Detailed results by council type ===
==== County councils ====
Authority	SF	Lab	U	Ind	IrishNat	Total	Result	Details
Antrim	1	0	17	1	2	21	Irish Unionist	Details
Armagh	5	0	14	1	3	23	Irish Unionist	Details
Carlow	13	7	0	0	0	20	Sinn Féin	Details
Cavan	20	0	0	0	1	21	Sinn Féin	Details
Clare	20	0	0	0	0	20	Sinn Féin	Details
Cork	32	0	0	0	0	32	Sinn Féin	Details
Donegal	14	0	2	0	4	20	Sinn Féin	Details
Down	4	2	13	0	1	20	Irish Unionist	Details
Dublin	12	2	3	2	0	19	Sinn Féin	Details
Fermanagh	6	0	9	0	5	20	Irish Nationalist	Details
Galway	20	0	0	0	0	20	Sinn Féin	Details
Kerry	20	0	0	0	0	20	Sinn Féin	Details
Kildare	15	5	0	1	0	21	Sinn Féin	Details
Kilkenny	16	2	0	1	0	19	Sinn Féin	Details
Queen's Co.	18	3	1	0	0	22	Sinn Féin	Details
Leitrim	19	0	0	0	0	19	Sinn Féin	Details
Limerick	20	0	0	0	0	20	Sinn Féin	Details
Londonderry	4	0	11	0	4	19	Irish Unionist	Details
Longford	20	0	0	0	0	20	Sinn Féin	Details
Louth	17	2	0	3	6	28	Sinn Féin	Details
Mayo	24	0	0	0	0	24	Sinn Féin	Details
Meath	20	0	0	1	0	21	Sinn Féin	Details
Monaghan	16	0	4	0	0	20	Sinn Féin	Details
King's Co.	19	2	0	0	0	21	Sinn Féin	Details
Roscommon	20	0	0	0	0	20	Sinn Féin	Details
Sligo	19	1	0	0	0	20	Sinn Féin	Details
North Tipperary	19	1	0	0	0	20	Sinn Féin	Details
South Tipperary	23	0	0	0	0	23	Sinn Féin	Details
Tyrone	8	0	11	0	7	26	Irish Nationalist	Details
Waterford	17	3	0	0	0	20	Sinn Féin	Details
Westmeath	15	5	0	0	3	23	Sinn Féin	Details
Wexford	16	2	0	0	1	19	Sinn Féin	Details
Wicklow	14	3	0	2	1	20	Sinn Féin	Details
Totals	526	40	85	12	37	701		

==== County Borough councils ====
Authority	SF	Lab	U	Ind	IrishNat	Total	Result	Details
Belfast	5	12	35	3	5	60	Irish Unionist	Details
Cork	30	3	0	3	14	56	Sinn Féin	Details
Dublin	42	14	1	14	9	80	Sinn Féin	Details
Limerick	26	6	0	4	0	40	Sinn Féin	Details
Waterford	22	3	0	4	10	40	Sinn Féin	Details

==== Urban district councils ====
Authority	SF	Lab	U	Ind	IrishNat	Other	Total	Result	Details
Armagh	5		8		5		18	No overall control	Details
Blackrock									Details
Dalkey									Details
Galway									Details
Killiney and Ballybrack									Details
Kilrush		5			7		12	Irish Nationalist	Details
Kingstown	5	4	8		4		21	No overall control	Details
Londonderry	10		19	1	10		40	No overall control	Details
Pembroke	6		6			3	15	No overall control	Details
Rathmines and Rathgar	9		11		1		21	Irish Unionist	Details
Omagh								Irish Nationalist	Details
Strabane								Irish Nationalist	Details
Totals									
