= 1920 Cork Corporation election =

Irish Elections

Elections to the Cork Corporation took place on Thursday 15 January 1920 as part of that year's Irish local elections.

== Campaign ==
The Labour vote was split between the Cork and District Labour Council and the more militant Irish Transport and General Workers' Union (ITGWU); the latter formed an electoral alliance with Sinn Féin, whose MPs elected in December 1918 had proclaimed an Irish Republic in January 1919. Polling day was marred by scenes of violence between supporters of Sinn Féin and ex-servicemen.

== Results by party ==
Party	Candidates	Seats	±	First Pref. votes	FPv%	±%
Sinn Féin–ITGWU	54	30	▲			
Irish Nationalist	33	14	▼			
Cork Ratepayers' Association	22	4				
Cork and District Labour Council	12	3	▲			
Ex-Soldiers & Sailors		2				
Independent	37	3				
Totals	160	56			100.0	—

== Results by local electoral area ==
The Local Government (Ireland) Act 1919 introduced the single transferable vote, so the seven wards used in previous council elections were revised into seven borough electoral areas (BEAs). Four inner wards were merged into one BEA, two outer wards were split into two and three BEAs, and one was retained as a BEA. The first two candidates elected in each area would be styled "alderman", the rest "councillor".

=== Central ===
37 candidates. Wards: Centre, North Centre, South Centre, and West.

Central: 10 seats
Party	Candidate	FPv%	Count
Party	Candidate	FPv%	1
Sinn Féin	J. J. Walsh MP (Note: The two candidates in North-West No.1 BEA named James Walsh and the James Joseph Walsh in Central BEA were three different people.)		
Ratepayers	Richard Beamish (Note: Outgoing alderman)		
Irish Nationalist	Daniel Gamble (Note: Outgoing councillor)		
Sinn Féin	Terence MacSwiney MP		
Sinn Féin	Prof Alfred O'Rahilly		
Irish Nationalist	Thomas Stack		
Ratepayers	William Desmond (Note: The following Nationalists in Centre BEA were also endorse by the Ratepayers: Denis Buckley, William F. O'Connor, and William Desmond.)		
Labour Council	Jeremiah Kelleher (Note: Two different men named Jeremiah Kelleher were elected: a Labour candidate and outgoing alderman from Gillabbey Terrace in Central BEA, and a Sinn Féin candidate from Lough Road in South No.1 BEA.)		
Sinn Féin	John Fitzpatrick		
Irish Nationalist	William F. O'Connor (Note: William F. O'Connor, the incumbent Lord Mayor, was returned in three electoral areas.)		
Irish Nationalist	R. H. Tilson		
Irish Nationalist	Cornelius Desmond		
Irish Nationalist	John Dunlea		
Irish Nationalist	Denis Cullinane		
Irish Nationalist	Denis Buckley		
Irish Nationalist	John Murphy		
Sinn Féin	Richard Hawkins		
Sinn Féin	John Jennings		
Sinn Féin	Francis Keogh		
Sinn Féin	Cornelius O'Donovan (Note: There were two candidates named Cornelius O'Donovan in Central BEA.)		
Sinn Féin	Timothy Francis O'Leary		
Sinn Féin	Denis O'Neill		
Ratepayers	Daniel Williams (Note: Daniel Williams ran in Central and North-East BEAs.)		
Ratepayers	T. H. G. Wallis		
Ratepayers	Daniel Humphreys		
Labour Council	John Hurley (Note: Two men named John Hurley ran in Central BEA.)		
Independent	William Hart		
Independent	Jeremiah Lane		
Independent	Patrick J. Bradley		
Independent	Eugene Buckley		
Independent	John Callanan		
Independent	Cornelius Curtin (Note: Cornelius Curtin ran in Central and North-West No.1 BEAs.)		
Independent	John Hurley		
Independent	John Hoare		
Independent	Mortimer Kelleher (Note: Mortimer Kelleher ran in Central, North-West No.1 and North-West No.3 BEAs.)		
Independent	Cornelius O'Donovan		
Independent	Robert Joseph Warren		

=== North-East ===
26 candidates

North-East: 10 seats
Party	Candidate	FPv%	Count
Party	Candidate	FPv%	1
Sinn Féin	William Stockley		
Irish Nationalist	James Daly		
Sinn Féin	Anne Sutton		
Irish Nationalist	Daniel Horgan (Note: Daniel Horgan ran in North-East and North-West No.2 BEAs.)		
Irish Nationalist	Michael Joseph O'Riordan		
Sinn Féin	Robert Day		
Ratepayers	Sir John Scott		
Ratepayers	James Thomas Mulligan		
Sinn Féin	Seán O'Leary		
Sinn Féin	Seán French		
Irish Nationalist	Matthew Kenneally		
Irish Nationalist	Cornelius Mullanny		
Sinn Féin	Ed. Goggin		
Sinn Féin	Stephen Heffernan		
Sinn Féin	Paul O'Flynn		
Ratepayers	A. M. Cole, JP		
Ratepayers	Simon Spiro, JP		
Ratepayers	John Ronan		
Ratepayers	Clarence de Foubert		
Ratepayers	Daniel Williams		
Independent	Patrick Clarke		
Independent	William Dalton		
Independent	Denis Mack (Note: Denis Mack ran in both North-East and North-West No.3 BEAs.)		
Independent	Maurice O'Carroll		
Independent	Robert Edwin Roberts		
Independent	Edward E. Whitaker		

=== North-West No.1 ===
23 candidates; covering Sunday's Well area

North-West No.1: 7 seats
Party	Candidate	FPv%	Count
Party	Candidate	FPv%	1
Sinn Féin	Frederick J. Murray		
Sinn Féin	Tadhg Barry (Note: Tadhg Barry was a union official representing the ITGWU portion of the join ITGWU–Sinn Fein ticket.)		
Labour Council	Patrick J. Murphy		
Irish Nationalist	William F. O'Connor		
Sinn Féin	James Allen		
Sinn Féin	Thomas Daly		
Independent	Michael Joseph O'Callaghan		
Irish Nationalist	John Joseph Doherty		
Irish Nationalist	Patrick Keane		
Irish Nationalist	Patrick F. O'Sullivan (Note: Patrick F. O'Sullivan of Dominick Street ran in North-West No.1 and No.2 BEAs; Patrick O'Sullivan of St. Mary's Terrace, Fair Hill, ran in North-West No.1 BEA.)		
Sinn Féin	Patrick O'Sullivan		
Sinn Féin	James Purcell		
Sinn Féin	James Walsh		
Ratepayers	Thomas Andrews		
Ratepayers	R. A. Atkins		
Ratepayers	Henry Dawson		
Labour Council	John O'Connor		
Independent	Cornelius Curtin		
Independent	Mortimer Kelleher		
Independent	Daniel Lynch		
Independent	Laurence Prior		
Independent	John Roche		
Independent	James Walsh		
Quota: 306

=== North-West No.2 ===
13 candidates; covering Shandon area.

North-West No.2: 6 seats
Party	Candidate	FPv%	Count
Party	Candidate	FPv%	1
Sinn Féin	Edmond Coughlan		
Sinn Féin	Patrick Higgins		
Irish Nationalist	John Francis O'Sullivan (Note: Seán O'Sullivan, John Francis O'Sullivan and John O'Sullivan were different people.)		
Irish Nationalist	Patrick F. O'Sullivan		
Sinn Féin	Simon Daly		
Ex-Soldiers & Sailors	Timothy O'Neill		
Irish Nationalist	Daniel Horgan		
Irish Nationalist	Patrick Stack		
Sinn Féin	John Kelleher		
Sinn Féin	Henry Lorton		
Sinn Féin	John O'Keeffe		
Ratepayers	Michael D. Spillane (Note: Michael D. Spillane ran in North-West No.2 and No.3 BEAs.)		
Independent	John Flynn		
Independent	Joseph Leonard		
Quota: 306

=== North-West No.3 ===
18 candidates; covering Blackpool area

North-West No. 3: 6 seats
Party	Candidate	FPv%	Count
Party	Candidate	FPv%	1
Sinn Féin	Tomás Mac Curtain		
Sinn Féin	Denis Lucey		
Ex-Soldiers & Sailors	Gerald Byrne (Note: Gerald Byrne ran in both North-West No.3 and South No.2 BEAs.)		
Sinn Féin	Mícheál Ó Cuill (Michael O'Quill)		
Sinn Féin	Thomas Patrick Forde		
Labour Council	Michael Egan		
Irish Nationalist	Edward A. Lyons		
Irish Nationalist	Charles Whelan		
Sinn Féin	Timothy Gearan		
Sinn Féin	Bartholomew Quinlan		
Ratepayers	Michael D. Spillane		
Labour Council	Cornelius Hobart		
Labour Council	Thomas Walsh		
Independent	Mortimer Kelleher		
Independent	Denis Mack		
Independent	John McAuley		
Independent	Daniel O'Leary		
Independent	Michael O'Connell		
Quota: 306

=== South No.1 ===
30 candidates

South No. 1: 11 seats
Party	Candidate	FPv%	Count
Party	Candidate	FPv%	1
Sinn Féin	Charles Coughlan		
Sinn Féin	Seán O'Sullivan		
Ind. Nationalist	John (Seán) Cronin (Note: John (Seán) Cronin ran in South No.1 and No.2 BEAs.)		
Sinn Féin	John (Seán) Good		
Irish Nationalist	John Horgan		
Sinn Féin	Jeremiah Kelleher		
Irish Nationalist	Simon Mahony		
Irish Nationalist	William F. O'Connor		
Sinn Féin	Liam (William) Russell (Note: William (Liam) Russell and William James Russell were different people.)		
Sinn Féin	John F. Sheehan (Note: John F. Sheehan and John Sheehan were different people.)		
Sinn Féin	Maurice Walsh		
Irish Nationalist	Jeremiah Ahern		
Irish Nationalist	David Murphy		
Irish Nationalist	Simon Mahony		
Irish Nationalist	James O'Connell		
Sinn Féin	William Kenneally		
Sinn Féin	Michael Landy		
Sinn Féin	Michael Murphy		
Sinn Féin	Frank O'Neill		
Ratepayers	Robert Pulvertaft		
Labour Council	James Harty		
Labour Council	William Waldrock		
Labour Council	John Donovan		
Independent	Thomas Donovan		
Independent	Fred Howe		
Independent	E. Magner		
Independent	John O'Sullivan		
Independent	William James Russell		
Independent	John Sheehan		
Independent	Daniel Sheehan		
Quota: 306

=== South No.2 ===
18 candidates

South No.2: 6 seats
Party	Candidate	FPv%	Count
Party	Candidate	FPv%	1
Sinn Féin	Liam de Róiste MP		697
Ind. Nationalist	Sir Edward Fitzgerald, 1st baronet		474
Sinn Féin	Daniel Barry		
Sinn Féin	Stephen John O'Riordan		
Irish Nationalist	John Desmond		
Irish Nationalist	William Ellis		
Irish Nationalist	John McCarthy		
Sinn Féin	Stephen Harrington		
Sinn Féin	Denis Hegarty		
Sinn Féin	P. Austin O'Riordan		
Ratepayers	Thomas Farrington		
Ratepayers	Thomas A. Callanan		
Labour Council	William Byrne		
Labour Council	Martin Hawkins		
Ex-Soldiers & Sailors	Gerald Byrne		
Ind. Nationalist	John (Seán) Cronin		
Independent	Joseph O'Brien		
Independent	Joseph Parfrey		
Quota: 306

== Subsequent changes ==
William F. O'Connor, having been returned in three BEAs, chose to represent North-West No.1, triggering by-elections in the other two BEAs on 10 March, both won by Sinn Féin candidates: Barry Egan defeated Jeremiah Lane in the Central ward, while Donal O'Callaghan was returned unopposed in South No.1. Ten subsequent by-elections returned: Joseph Hennessy, Madeline Hegarty, William Kenneally, Michael Moroney, Cornelius Neenan, Seán Nolan, Michael O'Donovan, Paul O'Flynn, James O'Riordan, and Jeremiah Walsh. Among the vacancies filled were several deaths related to the Irish War of Independence: Tomás Mac Curtain (assassinated by Royal Irish Constabulary members on 20 March 1920), his successor as Lord Mayor Terence MacSwiney (died on hunger strike on 25 October 1920), and Tadhg Barry (shot in Ballykinlar Camp, 15 November 1921).

In 1924 the Cumann na nGaedheal government dissolved the city council for misgovernment, after which the corporation was administered by an unelected commissioner. The next Free State local elections, originally scheduled for 1923, were repeatedly postponed until 1925. The city council was excluded from the 1925 and 1928 local elections and not restored until 1929, reduced to 21 councillors, with the entire county borough forming a single 21-seat electoral area.
