= 1920 Londonderry Borough Council election =

Local election in Northern Ireland

- Thursday 15 January 1920

All 40 seats on Londonderry Borough Council 21 seats needed for a majority
	First party	Second party	Third party
Party	UUP	Sinn Féin	Nationalist
Seats won	19	10	10
Mayor before election
Robert Newton Anderson
Irish Unionist
Mayor after election
Hugh O'Doherty
Ind. Nationalist

An election to Londonderry Borough Council took place on Thursday 15 January 1920 as part of that year's Irish local elections.

As a result, Unionists lost control over Londonderry borough council, which for the first time passed into the control of the city's Catholic majority. The various Nationalist parties in the city contested the election on a pan-nationalist front, emphasizing the national question of Irish self-government, as well as issues over housing.

The Local Government (Ireland) Act 1919 had seen the introduction of a PR electoral system for local government elections in Ireland. Turnout was high, at 93.5%. Despite the new electoral system only 2.8% of ballots were spoiled. Whilst Unionists won nearly 60% of the popular vote, this was connected to the Nationalist dominated West Ward going uncontested.

Nationalist control of the council would not last however, and following the partition of Ireland the Northern Irish Government restored the older, and less representative ward based system.

== Results by party ==
Party	Seats	±	First Pref. votes	FPv%	±%
Sinn Féin-Nationalist front	21 (10 SF, 10 N, 1 Ind N)		4,066	41.78	
UUP	19		5,666	58.22	
Totals	40		9,732	100.00	—

=== North Ward ===
The Unionists put forward 7 candidates, and Nationalists 5. The Unionists gave instructions that their candidates should be voted for in alphabetical order. In the first round Unionist candidates 1,923 votes (59.72%), and Nationalists 1,297 (40.28%).

North Ward – 11 seats
Party	Candidate	FPv%	Count										
Party	Candidate	FPv%	1	2	3	4	5	6	7	8	9	10	11
UUP	James Ballantine	52.04	1,687										
Nationalist	Richard Doherty		499										
Ind. Nationalist	Hugh C. O'Doherty		461										
UUP	R. A. Deane		20	1407									
Nationalist	Edward McCafferty		216	217									
UUP	Sir John McFarland		85	87									
Nationalist	Daniel O'Donnell		81	81									
UUP	H. N. Greenway		78	36									
UUP	S. W. Kennedy		67	75									
UUP	H. S. Robinson		60	63	63	63	64	64	64	65	65	69	312
Nationalist	William Joseph O'Donnell		40	40	58	81	81	205	218	218	218	218	218
UUP	B. K. Gilliland		21	35									
Electorate: 3,586 Valid: 3,220 Spoilt: 22 Quota: 269 Turnout: 3,242

=== Waterside Ward ===
In Waterside ward 6 Unionists and 3 Nationalists were returned. Anderson and Bradley, topping the poll, were appointed as Aldermen. Unionists were advised to vote and allocate their preferences for Unionist candidates alphabetically.

Waterside Ward – 9 seats
Party	Candidate	FPv%	Count								
Party	Candidate	FPv%	1	2	3	4	5	6	7	8	9
UUP	Alexander Anderson	37.85	974								
Sinn Féin	Cathal Bradley	15.51	399								
UUP	William H. Elliot	10.61	273								
UUP	James Blair	7.15	184	880							
Nationalist	F. O'Sullivan	9.83	252	252	260						
UUP	Thomas McCully	3.89	100	113	113	121	721				
UUP	J. H. Pollock	0.54	14	17	17	21	32	32	487		
UUP	D. P. Thompson	2.64	68	70	70	73	77	77	84	313	
Nationalist	Margaret Morris	7.54	194	196	226	226	227	228	228	228	228
Nationalist	Robert J. Donaghey	4.47	115	115	218	218	224	225	226	226	226
Electorate: ~ Valid: 2573 Spoilt: 28 Quota: 258 Turnout: 2601

=== South-East Ward ===
South-East Ward – 12 seats
Party	Candidate	FPv%	Count										
Party	Candidate	FPv%	1	2	3	4	5	6	7	8	9	10	11
UUP	H. Babington	50.44	1939										
Irish Nationalist	James Bonner	24.56	944										
Irish Nationalist	W. J. Barclay	5.98	230	232	830								
Irish Nationalist	Robert McAnaney	5.54	213	214	217	217	225	226	230	231	235	235	348
Irish Nationalist	Michael Cosgrove	4.29	165	166	196	198	696						
Sinn Féin	James Gallagher	3.67	141	141	146	148	152	158	172	172	409		
Irish Nationalist	Cou Doherty	3.02	116	117	128	129	153	156	537				
UUP	John Burns	1.01	39	45	46	1358							
UUP	John G. Magee	0.42	16	17	17	19	19	21	22	29	29	514	
UUP	T.G. Blair	0.36	14	1631									
UUP	David Mitchell	0.31	12	14	14	15	15	16	16	17	17	22	
UUP	James Hamilton	0.21	8	14	14	28	28	1071					
UUP	Henry G. McCay	0.18	7	13	13	14	14	20	20	786			
Electorate: - Valid: 3844 (98.94%) Spoilt: 41 (1.06%) Quota: 296 (7.70%) Turnout: 3885

=== West Ward ===
The combined Sinn Féin/Nationalist ticket put up 8 candidates for the 8 seats in the West Ward. The Unionist grouping in the city did not put up any candidates, resulting in there being no contest and the Sinn Féin/Nationalist candidates being all successful.

West Ward – 8 seats
Party	Candidate	FPv%	Count
Party	Candidate	FPv%	1
Sinn Féin	Con Bradley		No contest
Sinn Féin	Anthony Carlin		No contest
Sinn Féin	P. Hogarty		No contest
Sinn Féin	W. Logue		No contest
Sinn Féin	Patrick Meenan		No contest
Sinn Féin	James McLean		No contest
Sinn Féin	Joseph McKernan		No contest
Sinn Féin	D. J. Shiel		No contest
Electorate: -
