= 1920 Rathmines and Rathgar Urban District Council election =

Part of the 1920 Irish local elections

An election to the urban district council of Rathmines and Rathgar took place on Thursday, 15 January 1920 as part of the 1920 Irish local elections. The Local Government (Ireland) Act 1919 had changed the electoral system for local government in Ireland from first-past-the-post to single transferable vote.

The election saw Unionists reduced to a majority of 1 on the council. Prior to the election the Rathmines and Rathgar council had been composed almost entirely of Unionists.

Following the election, Robert Benson (Unionist) was elected chairman, and William Ireland (Unionist) was elected as vice-chairman. Mary Kettle, the only Irish Party representative, did not vote for a chairman; however, she voted for Áine Ceannt for vice-chairman. Ceannt lost to Ireland by a single vote.

== Results by party ==
Party	Seats	±	First Pref. votes	FPv%	±%
Irish Unionist	11	▼	4,589	45.83	
Sinn Féin	9	▲	3,952	39.46	
Irish Nationalist	1		987	9.86	
Independent	0		486	4.85	
Totals	21		10,014	100.00	—

== Results by local electoral area ==
=== No. 1 West Ward ===
No. 1 West Ward: 5 seats
Party	Candidate	FPv%	Count					
Party	Candidate	FPv%	1	2	3	4	5	6
Sinn Féin	William Sears MP	30.28	678					
Irish Unionist	George Metcalfe (incumbent)	22.42	502					
Irish Unionist	J. J. McKenzie	13.26	297	377				
Sinn Féin	Sean Doyle	10.94	245	-	-	337	340	407
Irish Nationalist	J. J. Kiernan	8.04	180	-	-	186	283	283
Sinn Féin	Madeleine ffrench-Mullen	5.94	133	-	-	234	234	356
Irish Unionist	A. A. O'Malley	4.96	111	-	-	164		
Sinn Féin	George Irvine	4.15	93	-	-	196	196	
Electorate: 3,158 Valid: 2,239 Spoilt: 30 Quota: 374 Turnout: 2,269

=== No. 2 West Ward ===
No. 2 West Ward: 5 seats
Party	Candidate	FPv%	Count
Party	Candidate	FPv%	1
Irish Unionist	Robert Benson (incumbent)		508
Sinn Féin	Robert Brennan		499
Irish Unionist	Mrs M. K. Dixon		392
Irish Unionist	William Ireland (incumbent)		256
Irish Nationalist	P. J. Munden		244
Independent	C. B. W. Boyle		226
Sinn Féin	Mrs M. J. Mulcahy		205
Irish Unionist	S. G. Slater		130
Sinn Féin	Archibald J. Nicolls		116
Irish Unionist	F. W. Giddings		78
Electorate: 3,585 Valid: 2,654 Spoilt: 34 Quota: 433 Turnout: 2,688

=== No. 1 East Ward ===
No. 1 East Ward: 4 seats
Party	Candidate	FPv%	Count		
Party	Candidate	FPv%	1		
Irish Unionist	Mr. Carruthers		494		
Sinn Féin	Dr. Kathleen Lynn		427		
Sinn Féin	James Dwyer		382	383	410
Irish Unionist	John Russell		221		
Irish Nationalist	Patrick Moore		202		
Irish Unionist	William M. Hatte		117		
Sinn Féin	Thomas O'Conner		83		
Electorate: 2,673 Valid: 1,926 Spoilt: 48 Quota: 386 Turnout: 1,974

=== No. 2 East Ward ===
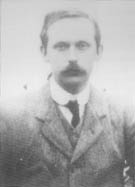
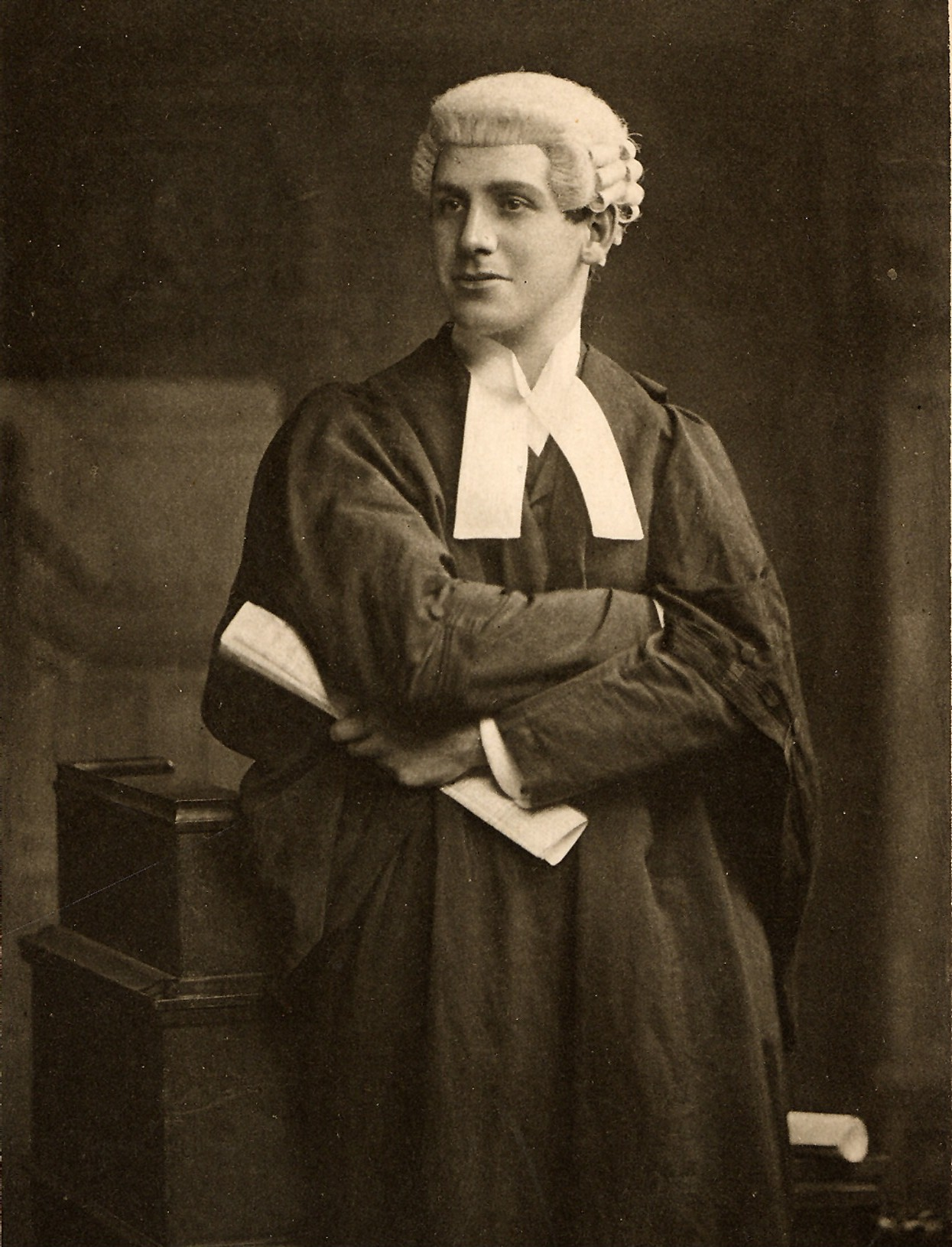
No. 2 East Ward saw the return of republican activist Áine Ceannt, Mary Kettle (daughter of David Sheehy and widow of Tom Kettle), along with the abstentionist Sinn Féin MP Joseph MacDonagh.

Ceannt's husband, Éamonn (left) had died fighting for the Irish Republican Brotherhood during the Easter Rising four years prior. Kettle's husband, Tom (right), a Home Ruler and former MP for East Tyrone, had died the same year fighting in the Battle of the Somme.

No. 2 East Ward: 7 seats
Party	Candidate	FPv%	Count	
Party	Candidate	FPv%	1	
Sinn Féin	Joseph MacDonagh MP		549	
Irish Unionist	John Sibthorpe		456	
Irish Unionist	J. C. Anderson		422	
Sinn Féin	Frances Ceannt		363	449
Irish Nationalist	Mary Kettle		361	
Irish Unionist	David Jackson M.D.		267	
Independent	Thomas Saul		260	
Irish Unionist	H. B. Goulding		235	
Sinn Féin	Thomas Cullen M.R.I.A.		127	
Irish Unionist	R. D. Bolton		103	
Sinn Féin	George Daly		52	
Electorate: 4,435 Valid: 3,195 Spoilt: 48 Quota: 400 Turnout: 3,243
