= 1920 Donegal County Council election =

Local election in Ireland

- 26 May 1920

All 20 seats on Donegal County Council 11 seats needed for a majority
	First party	Second party	Third party
Party	Sinn Féin	Irish Nationalist	Irish Unionist
Seats won	14	4	2
- Map showing the area of Donegal County Council
Council control after election
Sinn Féin

An election to Donegal County Council took place on Wednesday 26 May 1920 as part of that year's Irish local elections. 45 councillors were elected from 10 electoral divisions by PR-STV voting for a five-year term of office.

Sinn Féin won a majority of the seats, and won majorities in 6 of the 10 voting areas.

The vote was largely characterised by poor turnout, with less than 50% of the electorate voting. Buncrana, Letterkenny, and Milford saw particularly poor turnout. At one station in Rathmullan only 3 of the areas 140 voters turned out. Donegal Town saw better turnout.

The total number of invalid votes for the county stood at 9,193.

At the first sitting of the new council, on Friday 18 June, the council voted to recognise Dáil Éireann.

Following the election Peter J. Ward (Sinn Féin) was elected chairman. Thomas McFadden (Unionist) was elected vice-chairman.

== Results by party ==
Party	Seats	±	First Pref. votes	FPv%	±%
Sinn Féin	14				
Irish Nationalist	4				
Irish Unionist	2				
Independent	0				
Totals	20			100%	—

== Results by county electoral area ==
=== Buncrana ===
Buncrana/Inishowen - 4 seats
Party	Candidate	FPv%	Count
Party	Candidate	FPv%	1
Sinn Féin	P. H. Doherty		
Sinn Féin	Frank J. Langan		
Sinn Féin	Michael Bonner		
Sinn Féin	James McNally		
Irish Unionist	Joseph MacArthur J.P. (incumbent)		
Irish Nationalist	Bernard Browne		
Ind. Nationalist	James P. McIvor J.P.		

=== Donegal ===
Donegal - 5 seats
Party	Candidate	FPv%	Count
Party	Candidate	FPv%	1
Sinn Féin	Peter J. Ward MP		
Irish Unionist	James Sproule Myles		
Sinn Féin	Patrick Berry		
Sinn Féin	Henry Joseph Kelly		
Sinn Féin	Thomas McShane		
Irish Nationalist	Hugh O'Donnell		
Electorate: - Valid: ≈8,893 Spoilt: ≈300 Quota: - Turnout: 9,193

=== Letterkenny ===
Letterkenny - 4 seats
Party	Candidate	FPv%	Count
Party	Candidate	FPv%	1
Sinn Féin	John O'Flaherty		
Sinn Féin	James McCool		
Sinn Féin	James McFadden		
Irish Unionist	James Clarke		
Ind. Nationalist	Francis Callahan J.P. (incumbent)		
Irish Unionist	Major John Riky, J.P.		

=== Milford ===
Milford - 7 seats
Party	Candidate	FPv%	Count
Party	Candidate	FPv%	1
Sinn Féin	Thomas McElhinney		
Sinn Féin	Neil Murray		
Irish Nationalist	M. A. McCreadie		
Irish Nationalist	J. B. O'Donnell		
Sinn Féin	William McGarvey		
Irish Nationalist	E. Friel		
Irish Nationalist	Christy Lavey		

== District council results ==
The county was split into urban and rural districts, each with a council. Rural district councils were elected on the same day as the county council. Most districts were split into multiple district electoral areas (DEAs). Each district council chairperson was ex officio a member of the county council.

Rural districts and DEAs in County Donegal, 1920
Rural district	District electoral area	DEA seats	Total seats
Ballyshannon	Ballyshannon Rural	9	9
Donegal	Donegal	5	18
Donegal	Dunkineely	4	18
Donegal	Laghy	5	18
Donegal	Mountcharles	4	18
Dunfanaghy	Dunfanaghy	4	10
Dunfanaghy	Gortahork	6	10
Glenties	Annagarry	7	27
Glenties	Ardara	4	27
Glenties	Dunglow	6	27
Glenties	Glencolumbkille	4	27
Glenties	Glenties	3	27
Glenties	Killybegs	3	27
Inishowen	Buncrana Rural	7	21
Inishowen	Carndonagh	4	21
Inishowen	Malin	4	21
Inishowen	Moville	6	21
Letterkenny	Letterkenny Rural	8	13
Letterkenny	Temple Douglas	5	13
Londonderry No. 2	Londonderry No. 2 Rural	8	8
Milford	Carrickart	5	19
Milford	Fanad	4	19
Milford	Milford	7	19
Milford	Rathmullan	3	19
Strabane No. 2	Castlefinn	4	10
Strabane No. 2	Raphoe	6	10
Stranorlar	Cloghan	4	11
Stranorlar	Stranorlar	7	11

=== Donegal Rural District ===
==== Donegal DEA ====
Donegal Town - 5 seats
Party	Candidate	FPv%	Count
Party	Candidate	FPv%	1
Sinn Féin	James McGahern		
Sinn Féin	John McDermott		
Irish Unionist	John Stevenson		
Irish Nationalist	Edward Melly		
Irish Nationalist	Michael Dunnion		

==== Dunkineely DEA ====
Dunkineely - 4 seats
Party	Candidate	FPv%	Count
Party	Candidate	FPv%	1
Sinn Féin	Patrick Barry		
Sinn Féin	A. F. Gallagher		
Sinn Féin	Charlie Keeny		
Irish Nationalist	Thomas McShane		

==== Laghey DEA ====
Laghey - 5 seats
Party	Candidate	FPv%	Count
Party	Candidate	FPv%	1
Sinn Féin	Hugh Gallagher		
Sinn Féin	Daniel Gallagher		
Irish Unionist	James Harron		
Irish Nationalist	Jacob Gorman		
Irish Unionist	William John Shaw		

==== Mountcharles DEA ====
Mountcharles - 4 seats
Party	Candidate	FPv%	Count
Party	Candidate	FPv%	1
Sinn Féin	Bernard Friel		
Sinn Féin	Charles McDaid		
Sinn Féin	Paddy Gallagher		
Sinn Féin	James Boyle		

=== Dunfanaghy Rural District ===
==== Dunfanaghy DEA ====
Dunfanaghy - 4 seats
Party	Candidate	FPv%	Count
Party	Candidate	FPv%	1
Sinn Féin	Hugh Duffy		
Sinn Féin	C. McLaughlin		
Sinn Féin	Shane McNulty		
Irish Nationalist	John McNulty		

=== Letterkenny Rural District ===
==== Letterkenny Rural DEA ====
Letterkenny Rural - 5 seats
Party	Candidate	FPv%	Count
Party	Candidate	FPv%	1
Sinn Féin	N. Kelly		
Irish Unionist	Robert Roulstone		
Irish Nationalist	J. E. Sweeney		
Sinn Féin	John Mullan		
Sinn Féin	Patrick McGrenra		

==== Rathmullan DEA ====
Rathmullan - 3 seats
Party	Candidate	FPv%	Count
Party	Candidate	FPv%	1
Irish Nationalist	Edward Deeney		
Irish Nationalist	James Green		
Irish Nationalist	Patrick Loughrey		
