= 1920 Kingstown Urban District Council election =

1920 Irish local government election

The 1920 Kingstown Urban District Council election took place on Thursday 15 January 1920 as part of that year's Irish local elections.

Unionists emerged as the single largest party on the council, however, no party controlled an overall majority. Following the election the nationalist groups on the council formed a governing coalition. One of the actions of the new council was to rename the town, and council, to Dún Laoghaire, which is the Irish form of the original name for the town, Dunleary

== Results by party ==
Party	Seats	±	First Pref. votes (excl. West ward)	FPv% (excl. West ward)	±%
Irish Unionist	8	▲2	1,329	47.91	▲2.40
Sinn Féin	5	▲5	719	25.92	New
Irish Labour	4	▲4	335	12.08	New
Ind. Nationalist	4	Steady	207	7.46	New
Irish Nationalist	0	▼15	88	3.17	▼46.44
Ratepayers Association	0	Steady	96	3.46	New
Totals	21		2,774	100.00	—

== Results by local electoral area ==
=== Monkstown Ward ===
Party breakdown: Unionist: 40.29% (1 seat), Sinn Féin: 39.87% (1 seat), Ind Nat: 19.83% (1 seat).

Monkstown Ward - 3 seats
Party	Candidate	FPv%	Count		
Party	Candidate	FPv%	1	2	3
Irish Unionist	F. M. Bentley	40.29	193		
Sinn Féin	John Kirwan Woods	24.00	115	116	116
Ind. Nationalist	J. J. Kennedy (incumbent)	19.83	95	159	
Sinn Féin	Patrick Farrell	15.87	76	84	Eliminated
Electorate: 673 Valid: 479 Spoilt: 26 Quota: 120 Turnout: 505

=== West Ward ===
Party breakdown: Sinn Féin: (3 seats), Unionist: (2 seats), Ind Nat: (2 seats), Labour: (1 seat).

West Ward - 8 seats
Party	Candidate	FPv%	Count
Party	Candidate	FPv%	1
Sinn Féin	John Kirwan Woods		
Irish Labour	Edward Kelly (incumbent)		
Irish Unionist	T. M. Good		
Ind. Nationalist	J. M. Devitt		
Ind. Nationalist	M. F. O'Brien (incumbent)		
Irish Unionist	W. J. Scanlon		
Sinn Féin	P. J. O'Hanlon		
Sinn Féin	W. Morrissey		
Irish Nationalist	J. J. Kennedy (incumbent Chairman)		Defeated
Sinn Féin	J. McGovern		Defeated
Irish Labour	F. J. O'Reilly		Defeated
Irish Unionist	H. T. B. Robinson		Defeated
Irish Nationalist	C. Rochford		Defeated
Irish Labour	A. Whelan		Defeated
Electorate: 2,054 Valid: - Spoilt: - Quota: - Turnout: 1,534

=== East Ward ===
Party breakdown: Unionist: 52.54% (3 seats), Sinn Féin: 20.02% (1 seat), Labour: 13.16% (1 seat), Ratepayer 9.02% (0 seats), Nat 5.26% (0 seats).

East Ward - 5 seats
Party	Candidate	FPv%	Count
Party	Candidate	FPv%	1
Irish Unionist	Dr. Merrin		249
Irish Unionist	Sir T. Robinson		167
Irish Unionist	C. M. Cooke		127
Irish Labour	R. Byrne		119
Ratepayers	C. J. Reiddy		96
Sinn Féin	Mrs Barry		91
Sinn Féin	J. W. Sullivan		74
Irish Nationalist	Ml. Murray		56
Sinn Féin	J. Nelligan		37
Irish Labour	M. L. Reilly		21
Irish Unionist	W. A. Evans		16
Sinn Féin	P. J. Geoghegan		11
Electorate: 1,368 Valid: 1,064 Spoilt: 25 Quota: 178 Turnout: 1,089

=== Glasthule Ward ===
Party breakdown: Unionist: 46.87% (2 seats), Sinn Féin: 25.59% (1 seat), Labour: 15.84% (1 seat), Ind Nat: 9.10% (1 seat), Nat: 2.60% (0 seats).

Glasthule Ward - 5 seats
Party	Candidate	FPv%	Count
Party	Candidate	FPv%	1
Irish Unionist	R. N. Potterton		323
Sinn Féin	Miss J. Cantwell		238
Irish Unionist	H. C. Falkiner		128
Ind. Nationalist	H. F. Monks		112
Irish Labour	G. Dixon		61
Irish Unionist	A. M. Fleming		94
Sinn Féin	E. W. Proud		77
Irish Labour	W. J. Carroll		70
Irish Labour	C. Drumgool		64
Irish Unionist	N. Ormsby Scott		32
Irish Nationalist	J. J. Kennedy		32
Electorate: 1,631 Valid: 1,231 Quota: 206 Turnout: 1,303
