= 1906 Liverpool City Council election =

Liverpool City Council elections 1906

← 1905	November 1, 1906	1907 →

34 seats were up for election (one third): one seat for each of the 34 wards 69 (incl. Aldermen) seats needed for a majority

Elections to Liverpool City Council were held on 1 November 1906.

One councillor was elected for each of the thirty-four wards. A total of fourteen councillors were elected unopposed, and twenty councillors were elected in contested elections.

Fourteen of the thirty-four seats were uncontested.

The Liverpool Protestant Party lost all three of the seats that they had won in the 1903 elections.

After the election, the composition of the council was:

Party	Councillors	±	Aldermen	Total
Conservative	??	??	??	72
Liberal	??	0	??	46
Irish Nationalist	12	+1	2	14
Protestant	2	-3	0	2
Labour	1	0	0	1
Socialist Party	1	0	0	1

== Election result ==
Liverpool local election result 1906
Party	Seats	Gains	Losses	Net gain/loss	Seats %	Votes %	Votes	+/−
Conservative	22				65%			
Liberal	7	1	1	0	21%			
Irish Nationalist	5	1	0	+1	15%			
Protestant	0	0	3	-3	0%			
Labour	0	0	0	0	0%			
Independent	0	0	0	0	0%			

== Ward results ==
* - Retiring Councillor seeking re-election

Comparisons are made with the 1903 election results, as the retiring councillors were elected in that year.

=== Abercromby ===
No. 21 Abercromby
Party	Candidate	Votes	%	±%
Conservative	Edward Lawrence	879	54%	
Liberal	Charles Allcot Whitney *	756	46%	
Majority		123		
Registered electors		2,514		
Turnout		1,635	65%	
Conservative gain from Liberal		Swing		

=== Aigburth ===
No. 29 Aigburth
Party	Candidate	Votes	%	±%
Liberal	Albert Edward Jacob	559	52%	
Conservative	William Parkfield Wethered	520	48%	
Majority		39		
Registered electors		1,450		
Turnout		1,079		
Liberal gain from Conservative		Swing		

=== Anfield ===
No. 3 Anfield
Party	Candidate	Votes	%	±%
Liberal	Henry Jones *	1,030	86%	
Independent	Joseph Bowers	174	14%	
Majority		856		
Registered electors		2,830		
Turnout		1,204	43%	
Liberal hold		Swing		

=== Breckfield ===
No. 6 Breckfield
Party	Candidate	Votes	%	±%
Conservative	William Herbert Priest *	unopposed		
Registered electors				
Conservative hold		Swing		

=== Brunswick ===
No. 25 Brunswick
Party	Candidate	Votes	%	±%
Irish Nationalist	John Alfred Kelly *	unopposed		
Registered electors				
Irish Nationalist gain from Nationalist Party (Ireland) and Liberal Party (UK)				

=== Castle Street ===
No. 18 Castle Street
Party	Candidate	Votes	%	±%
Conservative	James Willcox Alsop *	unopposed		
Registered electors				
Conservative hold		Swing		

=== Dingle ===
No. 26 Dingle
Party	Candidate	Votes	%	±%
Conservative	Owen Harrison Williams	1,499	72%	
Liberal	Thomas Byrne	586	28%	
Majority		913		
Registered electors		5,268		
Turnout		2,085	40%	
Conservative hold		Swing		

=== Edge Hill ===
No. 12 Edge Hill
Party	Candidate	Votes	%	±%
Conservative	William Edward Parry *	1,551	64%	
Liberal	George Parker	870	36%	
Majority		681		
Registered electors		4,791		
Turnout		2,421	51%	
Conservative hold		Swing		

=== Everton ===
No. 9 Everton
Party	Candidate	Votes	%	±%
Conservative	Edward Lewis Lloyd *	unopposed		
Registered electors				
Conservative hold		Swing		

=== Exchange ===
No. 16 Exchange
Party	Candidate	Votes	%	±%
Conservative	John Sutherland Harmood-Banner *	unopposed		
Registered electors				
Conservative hold		Swing		

=== Fairfield ===
No. 4 Fairfield
Party	Candidate	Votes	%	±%
Liberal	Francis L'Estrange Joseph *	unopposed		
Registered electors				
Liberal hold		Swing		

=== Garston ===
No. 30 Garston
Party	Candidate	Votes	%	±%
Conservative	Joshua Burrow	1,035	64%	
Labour	William James Gerrard	575	36%	
Majority		460		
Registered electors		2,139		
Turnout		1,610	75%	
Conservative gain from Protestant		Swing		

=== Granby ===
No. 22 Granby
Party	Candidate	Votes	%	±%
Liberal	Joseph Harrison Jones *	unopposed		
Registered electors				
Liberal hold		Swing		

=== Great George ===
No. 20 Great George
Party	Candidate	Votes	%	±%
Conservative	William Muirhead *	836	65%	
Liberal	Horace Muspratt	454	35%	
Majority		382		
Registered electors		1,761		
Turnout		1,290	73%	
Conservative hold		Swing		

=== Kensington ===
No. 11 Kensington
Party	Candidate	Votes	%	±%
Conservative	Robert Lowry Burns *	1,784	69%	
Socialist (GB)	Arthur Kilpin Bulley	787	31%	
Majority		997		
Registered electors		4,754		
Turnout		2,571	54%	
Conservative hold		Swing		

=== Kirkdale ===
No. 2 Kirkdale
Party	Candidate	Votes	%	±%
Conservative	Theodore Lowry	1,570	46%	
Protestant	William Singleton	1,200	35%	
Labour	Frederick Norris	612	13%	
Majority		370		
Registered electors		6,396		
Turnout		3,382	53%	
Conservative gain from Protestant		Swing		

=== Low Hill ===
No. 10 Low Hill
Party	Candidate	Votes	%	±%
Conservative	Anthony Shelerdine	1,277	64%	
Liberal	Evan Arthur Davies	703	36%	
Majority		574		
Registered electors		3,874		
Turnout		1,980	51%	
Conservative hold		Swing		

=== Netherfield ===
No. 8 Netherfield
Party	Candidate	Votes	%	±%
Conservative	Charles Henry Rutherford	1,057	54%	
Protestant	John Walker	907	46%	
Majority		150		
Registered electors		4,093		
Turnout		1,964	48%	
Conservative gain from		Swing		

=== North Scotland ===
No. 13 North Scotland
Party	Candidate	Votes	%	±%
Irish Nationalist	Thomas Kelly *	unopposed		
Registered electors				
Irish Nationalist hold		Swing		

=== Old Swan ===
No. 28A Old Swan
Party	Candidate	Votes	%	±%
Conservative	James Wilson Walker *	1,044	68%	
Liberal	John Harrison	498	32%	
Majority		546		
Registered electors		2,984		
Turnout		1,542	52%	
Conservative hold		Swing		

=== Prince's Park ===
No. 23 Prince's Park
Party	Candidate	Votes	%	±%
Conservative	Harold Chaloner Dowdall *	1,297	59%	
Liberal	William Edward Woodall	888	41%	
Majority		409		
Registered electors		3,600		
Turnout		2,185	61%	
Conservative hold		Swing		

=== Sandhills ===
No. 1 Sandhills
Party	Candidate	Votes	%	±%
Irish Nationalist	Michael Edward Kearney *	unopposed		
Registered electors				
Irish Nationalist hold		Swing		

=== St. Anne's ===
No. 17 St. Anne's
Party	Candidate	Votes	%	±%
Liberal	George King *	unopposed		
Registered electors				
Liberal hold		Swing		

=== St. Domingo ===
No. 7 St. Domingo
Party	Candidate	Votes	%	±%
Conservative	Joseph Roby	1,155	54%	
Protestant	Samuel George Thomas	984	46%	
Majority		171		
Registered electors		4,552		
Turnout		2,139	47%	
Conservative gain from Protestant		Swing		

=== St. Peter's ===
No. 19 St. Peter's
Party	Candidate	Votes	%	±%
Conservative	George Fewkes Clarke	629	59%	
Liberal	William Cossfield *	430	41%	
Majority		199		
Registered electors		1,809		
Turnout		1,059	59%	
Conservative gain from Liberal		Swing		

=== Sefton Park East ===
No. 24A Sefton Park East
Party	Candidate	Votes	%	±%
Liberal	John Japp *	unopposed		
Registered electors				
Liberal hold		Swing		

=== Sefton Park West ===
No. 24 Sefton Park West
Party	Candidate	Votes	%	±%
Liberal	Herbert Reynolds Rathbone *	unopposed		
Registered electors				
Liberal hold		Swing		

=== South Scotland ===
No. 14 South Scotland
Party	Candidate	Votes	%	±%
Irish Nationalist	John O'Shea *	unopposed		
Registered electors				
Irish Nationalist hold		Swing		

=== Vauxhall ===
No. 15 Vauxhall
Party	Candidate	Votes	%	±%
Irish Nationalist	Thomas Burke *	unopposed		
Registered electors				
Irish Nationalist hold		Swing		

=== Walton ===
No. 3A Walton
Party	Candidate	Votes	%	±%
Conservative	Richard Pritchard	1,582	65%	
Liberal	Thomas Utley	835	35%	
Majority		747		
Registered electors		4,318		
Turnout		2,417	56%	
Conservative hold		Swing		

=== Warbreck ===
No. 27 Warbreck
Party	Candidate	Votes	%	±%
Conservative	Robert Charles Herman	1,194	65%	
Liberal	Robert Owen	651	35%	
Majority		543		
Registered electors		3,190		
Turnout		1,845	58%	
Conservative hold		Swing		

=== Wavertree ===
No. 5 Wavertree
Party	Candidate	Votes	%	±%
Conservative	Arthur Crosthwaite *	805	58%	
Liberal	Thomas Philip Maguire	586	42%	
Majority		219		
Registered electors		2,629		
Turnout		1,391	53%	
Conservative hold		Swing		

=== Wavertree West ===
No. 5A Wavertree West
Party	Candidate	Votes	%	±%
Conservative	Herbert Preston Reynolds	1,065	54%	
Liberal	George Reed Beale	890	46%	
Majority		175		
Registered electors		3,552		
Turnout		1,955	55%	
Conservative hold		Swing		

=== West Derby ===
No. 28 West Derby
Party	Candidate	Votes	%	±%
Conservative	William Henry Parkinson	1,208	66%	
Liberal	Thomas Shaw	624	34%	
Majority		584		
Registered electors		2,917		
Turnout		1,832	63%	
Conservative hold		Swing		

== Aldermanic elections ==
=== Aldermanic Election 5 December 1906 ===
Caused by the death of Alderman Thomas Evans (Conservative, elected 9 November 1901).

In his place, Councillor Louis Samuel Cohen (Conservative, Breckfield, elected 1 November 1905) was elected by the Council as an alderman on 5 December 1906

Party	Alderman	Ward	Term expired
Conservative	Louis Samuel Cohen		1907

=== Aldermanic election ===
The death of Alderman Joseph Ball JP (Conservative, elected as an alderman on 9 November 1901) on 11 August 1907 was reported to the council on 4 September 1907.

This position was filled by ???

== By-elections ==
=== No. 6 Breckfield, 23 January 1907 ===
Caused by Councillor Louis Samuel Cohen (Conservative, Breckfield, elected on 1 November 1905) being elected by the Council as an alderman on 5 December 1906.

No. 6 Breckfield
Party	Candidate	Votes	%	±%
Conservative	Frank John Leslie	1,079		
	John Meek	815		
Majority		264		
Registered electors				
Turnout		1,894		
Conservative hold		Swing		

== See also ==
- Liverpool City Council
- Liverpool Town Council elections 1835 - 1879
- Liverpool City Council elections 1880–present
- Mayors and Lord Mayors of Liverpool 1207 to present
- History of local government in England
