= 1905 Liverpool City Council election =

Liverpool City Council elections 1905

← 1904	November 1, 1905	1906 →

34 seats were up for election (one third): one seat for each of the 34 wards 69 (incl. Aldermen) seats needed for a majority

Elections to Liverpool City Council were held on Wednesday 1 November 1905.

There were three new seats: the first seat for Fazakerley, the third seat for Wavertree West and the second seat for Old Swan.

This election saw the first Socialist and Labour Councillors elected to the Council.

Eleven of the 35 seats were uncontested.

After the election, the composition of the council was:

Party	Councillors	±	Aldermen	Total
Conservative	??	-3	??	70
Liberal	??	+7	??	48
Irish Nationalist	??	-1	??	12
Protestant	5	-1	0	5
Socialist	1	+1	0	1
Labour	1	+1	0	1
Independent Irish Nationalist	??	-1	0	??

== Election result ==
Liverpool local election result 1905
Party	Seats	Gains	Losses	Net gain/loss	Seats %	Votes %	Votes	+/−
Liberal	20	7	0	+6	54%	34%	15,864	
Conservative	10	2	5	-3	31%	47%	22,319	
Irish Nationalist	2	0	1	-1	5.7%	3.6%	1,715	
Socialist	1	1	0	+1	2.9%	2.4%	1,137	
Labour Repr. Cmte.	1	1	0	+1	2.9%	1.9%	884	
Independent Irish Nationalist	1	1	0	+1	2.9%	1.7%	809	
Protestant	0	0	1	-1	0%	4.3%	2,037	
Independent	0	0	0	0	0%	0.73%	344	

== Ward results ==
* - Retiring Councillor seeking re-election

Comparisons are made with the 1902 election results, as the retiring councillors were elected in that year.

=== Abercromby ===
No. 21 Abercromby
Party	Candidate	Votes	%	±%
Liberal	Arthur Black *	850	51%	
Conservative	William Phillips	827	49%	
Majority		23		
Registered electors		2,647		
Turnout		1,677	63%	
Liberal hold		Swing		

=== Aigburth ===
No. 29 Aigburth
Party	Candidate	Votes	%	±%
Conservative	Hartley Wilson *	469	50%	
Liberal	Albert Edward Jacob	466	50%	
Majority		3		
Registered electors		1,319		
Turnout		935	71%	
Conservative hold		Swing		

=== Anfield ===
No. 3 Anfield
Party	Candidate	Votes	%	±%
Liberal	William Evans *	unopposed		
Registered electors				
Liberal hold		Swing		

=== Breckfield ===
No. 6 Breckfield
Party	Candidate	Votes	%	±%
Conservative	Louis Samuel Cohen *	1,612	62%	
Protestant	James Henry Taylor	978	38%	
Majority		634		
Registered electors		4,190		
Turnout		2,590	62%	
Conservative hold		Swing		

=== Brunswick ===
No. 25 Brunswick
Party	Candidate	Votes	%	±%
Liberal	Thomas Roberts *	unopposed		
Registered electors				
Liberal hold		Swing		

=== Castle Street ===
No. 18 Castle Street
Party	Candidate	Votes	%	±%
Liberal	Thomas Augustus Patterson *	675	53%	
Conservative	Alexander Wilson	600	47%	
Majority		75		
Registered electors		2,106		
Turnout		1,275		
Liberal hold		Swing		

=== Dingle ===
No. 26 Dingle
Party	Candidate	Votes	%	±%
Conservative	Dr. Richard Caton	unopposed		
Registered electors				
Conservative hold		Swing		

=== Edge Hill ===
No. 12 Edge Hill
Party	Candidate	Votes	%	±%
Liberal	Clement Freeman	1,380	51%	
Conservative	John Gordon	1,341	49%	
Majority		39		
Registered electors		4,831		
Turnout		2,721	56%	
Liberal gain from Conservative		Swing		

=== Everton ===
No. 9 Everton
Party	Candidate	Votes	%	±%
Liberal	William Denton *	1,319	53%	
Conservative	Owen Harrison Williams	1,163	47%	
Majority		156		
Registered electors		4,631		
Turnout		2,482	54%	
Liberal hold		Swing		

=== Exchange ===
No. 16 Exchange
Party	Candidate	Votes	%	±%
Liberal	Joseph Bibby *	unopposed		
Registered electors				
Liberal hold		Swing		

=== Fairfield ===
No. 4 Fairfield
Party	Candidate	Votes	%	±%
Conservative	Frank John Leslie *	650	84%	
Independent	James McCormick	126	16%	
Majority		524		
Registered electors		3,694		
Turnout		776	21%	
Conservative hold		Swing		

=== Fazakerley ===
No. 31 Fazakerley
Party	Candidate	Votes	%	±%
Conservative	Henry Sharrock Higginbottom	290	65%	
Liberal	Thomas Hesketh	154	35%	
Majority		290		
Registered electors		560		
Turnout		444	79%	
Conservative win (new seat)				

=== Garston ===
No. 30 Garston
Party	Candidate	Votes	%	±%
Liberal	James Picthall	832	54%	
Conservative	George Washington Hughes	706	46%	
Majority		126		
Registered electors		2,016		
Turnout		1,538	76%	
Liberal hold		Swing		

=== Granby ===
No. 22 Granby
Party	Candidate	Votes	%	±%
Liberal	John Lea *	unopposed		
Registered electors				
Liberal hold		Swing		

=== Great George ===
No. 20 Great George
Party	Candidate	Votes	%	±%
Liberal	John Lamport Ellis *	unopposed		
Registered electors				
Liberal hold		Swing		

=== Kensington ===
No. 11 Kensington
Party	Candidate	Votes	%	±%
Socialist	John Wolfe Tone Morrisey	1,137	40%	
Conservative	Dr. Charles Alexander Hill	1,076	37%	
Liberal	Benjamin Loft Wilson	659	23%	
Majority		61		
Registered electors		4,632		
Turnout		2,872	62%	
Socialist gain from Conservative		Swing		

=== Kirkdale ===
No. 2 Kirkdale
Party	Candidate	Votes	%	±%
Conservative	Dr. John Utting *	1,609	62%	
Labour	John Stewart Ratcliffe	986	38%	
Majority		623		
Registered electors		6,338		
Turnout		2,595	41%	
Conservative hold		Swing		

=== Low Hill ===
No. 10 Low Hill
Party	Candidate	Votes	%	±%
Liberal	John McEvoy	1,013	51%	
Conservative	Joseph Roby *	972	49%	
Majority		41		
Registered electors		3,902		
Turnout		1,985	51%	
Liberal gain from Conservative		Swing		

=== Netherfield ===
No. 8 Netherfield
Party	Candidate	Votes	%	±%
Conservative	William Watson Rutherford MP *	1,244	78%	
Independent	John Carr	342	22%	
Majority		902		
Registered electors		4,181		
Turnout		1,586	38%	
Conservative hold		Swing		

=== North Scotland ===
No. 13 North Scotland
Party	Candidate	Votes	%	±%
Irish Nationalist	Austin Harford	unopposed		
Registered electors				
Irish Nationalist hold		Swing		

=== Old Swan ===
No. 28A Old Swan
Party	Candidate	Votes	%	±%
Independent Irish Nationalist	Michael Phelan	809	53%	
Irish Nationalist	James Bolger	713	47%	
Majority		96		
Registered electors		3,123		
Turnout		1,522	49%	
Independent Irish Nationalist win (new seat)				

=== Prince's Park ===
No. 23 Prince's Park
Party	Candidate	Votes	%	±%
Liberal	Acheson Lyle Rupert Rathbone *	1,098	51%	
Conservative	Frederick William Frodsham	1,069	49%	
Majority		29		
Registered electors				
Turnout		2,167		
Liberal hold		Swing		

=== Sandhills ===
No. 1 Sandhills
Party	Candidate	Votes	%	±%
Liberal and Irish Nationalist	Patrick Joseph Deery	1,002	51%	
Protestant	William Singleton	978	49%	
Majority		24		
Registered electors		3,332		
Turnout		1,980	59%	
Liberal and Irish Nationalist hold		Swing		

=== St. Anne's ===
No. 17 St. Anne's
Party	Candidate	Votes	%	±%
Labour	James Sexton	884	54%	
Conservative	Harris Fineberg	709	44%	
Independent	John Murphy	2	0.13%	
Majority		175		
Registered electors		2,903		
Turnout		1,595	55%	
Labour gain from Conservative		Swing		

=== St. Domingo ===
No. 7 St. Domingo
Party	Candidate	Votes	%	±%
Conservative	George William Whittaker	1,406	57%	
Protestant	William Ellis Jones *	1,059	43%	
Majority		347		
Registered electors		4,553		
Turnout		2,465	54%	
Conservative gain from Protestant		Swing		

=== St. Peter's ===
No. 19 St. Peter's
Party	Candidate	Votes	%	±%
Liberal	Alexander Armour *	unopposed		
Registered electors				
Liberal hold		Swing		

=== Sefton Park East ===
No. 24A Sefton Park East
Party	Candidate	Votes	%	±%
Liberal	Wilfrid Bowring Stoddart *	1,137	54%	
Conservative	William Parkfield Wethered	983	46%	
Majority		154		
Registered electors		3,484		
Turnout		2,120	61%	
Liberal hold		Swing		

=== Sefton Park West ===
No. 24 Sefton Park West
Party	Candidate	Votes	%	±%
Conservative	Richard Dart *	780	56%	
Liberal	Harold Goad Crosfield	618	44%	
Majority		780		
Registered electors		2,092		
Turnout		1,398	67%	
Conservative hold		Swing		

=== South Scotland ===
No. 14 South Scotland
Party	Candidate	Votes	%	±%
Irish Nationalist	Austin Harford *	unopposed		
Registered electors				
Irish Nationalist hold		Swing		

=== Vauxhall ===
No. 15 Vauxhall
Party	Candidate	Votes	%	±%
Liberal	Richard Robert Meade-King *	unopposed		
Registered electors				
Liberal hold		Swing		

=== Walton ===
No. 3A Walton
Party	Candidate	Votes	%	±%
Conservative	George Brodrick Smith Brodrick *	1,079	51%	
Liberal	George Mitchell	1,057	49%	
Majority		22		
Registered electors		4,062		
Turnout		2,136	53%	
Conservative hold		Swing		

=== Warbreck ===
No. 27 Warbreck
Party	Candidate	Votes	%	±%
Liberal	Edward West	957	59%	
Conservative	Thomas Alfred Bell	663	41%	
Majority		294		
Registered electors		2,828		
Turnout		1,620	57%	
Liberal gain from Conservative		Swing		

=== Wavertree ===
No. 5 Wavertree
Party	Candidate	Votes	%	±%
Liberal	Charles Clarke Morrison	907	63%	
Conservative	James Stewart	543	37%	
Majority		364		
Registered electors		2,323		
Turnout		1,450	62%	
Liberal gain from Liberal Unionist		Swing		

=== Wavertree West ===
No. 5A Wavertree West
Party	Candidate	Votes	%	±%
Liberal	William Berrington Jones	1,167	55%	
Conservative	James Willcox Allsopp	938	45%	
Majority		229		
Registered electors		3,496		
Turnout		2,105	60%	
Liberal win (new seat)				

=== West Derby ===
No. 28 West Derby
Party	Candidate	Votes	%	±%
Liberal	Samuel Skelton	966	57%	
Conservative	Sidney Stanley Dawson	741	43%	
Majority		225		
Registered electors		2,742		
Turnout		1,707	62%	
Liberal hold		Swing		

== Aldermanic Election, 13 June 1906 ==
Caused by the resignation of Alderman William Edward Willink (Conservative, Wavertree West, elected 9 November 1903) was reported to the Council on 2 May 1906, in his place, Councillor Simon Jude (Conservative, Netherfield, elected 1 November 1903)

was elected as an alderman on 13 June 1906.

Party	Alderman	Ward	Term expires
Conservative	Simon Jude	No.5A Wavertree	1907

== By-elections ==
=== No.18 Castle Street, 18 December 1905 ===
Caused by the resignation of Councillor John Thomas Wood (Conservative, Castle Street, elected 2 November 1903) was reported to the Council on 6 December 1905

No. 18 Castle Street
Party	Candidate	Votes	%	±%
Conservative	James Willcox Alsop	unopposed		
Registered electors		2,106		
Conservative hold		Swing		

=== No.17 St. Anne's, ===
Caused by the resignation of Councillor Isaac Caton Glover (Conservative, St. Anne's, elected 1 November 1904) which was reported to the Council on 7 February 1906

No. 17 St. Anne's
Party	Candidate	Votes	%	±%
Liberal	Dr. James Clement Baxter	710	55%	
	Joseph Maguire	574	45%	
Majority		136		
Registered electors		2,903		
Turnout		1,284	44%	
Liberal gain from Conservative		Swing		

=== No.4 Fairfield, 19 April 1906 ===
Caused by the resignation of Councillor Frank John Leslie (Conservative, Fairfield, elected 1 November 1905) which was reported to the Council on 4 April 1906.

No. 4 Fairfield
Party	Candidate	Votes	%	±%
Conservative	Alfred Gates	1,000	53%	
Independent	Thomas Dowd	894	47%	
Majority		106		
Registered electors		3,694		
Turnout		1,894	51%	
Conservative hold		Swing		

=== No.25 Brunswick, 15 May 1906 ===
Caused by the resignation of Councillor Thomas Byrne (Liberal, Brunswick, elected 1 November 1904) which was reported to the Council on 2 May 1906

No. 25 Brunswick
Party	Candidate	Votes	%	±%
Liberal	Patrick Charles Kelly	730	56%	
	William Richard Gasking	444	33%	
	Thomas Byrne	176	13%	
Majority		286		
Registered electors				
Turnout		1,350		
Liberal hold		Swing		

=== No.8 Netherfied, 5 July 1906 ===
Caused by Councillor Simon Jude (Conservative, Netherfield, elected 1 November 1903) being elected as an alderman on 13 June 1906

No. 8 Netherfield
Party	Candidate	Votes	%	±%
	James Tomkinson	797	56%	
Protestant	John Walker	619	44%	
Majority		178		
Registered electors		4,181		
Turnout		1,416	34%	
gain from		Swing		

== See also ==
- Liverpool City Council
- Liverpool Town Council elections 1835 - 1879
- Liverpool City Council elections 1880–present
- Mayors and Lord Mayors of Liverpool 1207 to present
- History of local government in England
