= 1920 Waterford Corporation election =

Elections to the Waterford Corporation took place on Thursday 15 January 1920 as part of that year's Irish local elections.

== Results by party ==
Party	Seats	±	First Pref. votes	FPv%	±%
Sinn Féin	22				
Irish Nationalist	10				
Labour	3				
Independent	3				
Women's National Health Association	1				
Totals	39			100%	—

== Results by local electoral area ==
=== Customs House and Center Ward ===
Customs House and Center Ward – 9 seats (21 candidates)
Party	Candidate	FPv%	Count
Party	Candidate	FPv%	1
Sinn Féin	Dr Vincent White		
Irish Nationalist	Bryan Cunningham		
Sinn Féin	Maurice Quinlan		
Sinn Féin	William Jones		
Sinn Féin	John Walsh		
Irish Nationalist	John Hearn		
Sinn Féin	Robert Calten		
Irish Nationalist	Richard Hearn		
Irish Nationalist	Edward Walsh		
Quota:

=== West Ward ===
West Ward – 6 seats (12 candidates)
Party	Candidate	FPv%	Count
Party	Candidate	FPv%	1
Irish Nationalist	D. Denny		
Sinn Féin	T. D. Connolly		
Sinn Féin	J. Morris		
Sinn Féin	J. Gallagher		
Irish Nationalist	W. P. Maher		
Labour	I. Larkin		
Quota:

=== South Ward ===
South Ward – 6 seats
Party	Candidate	FPv%	Count
Party	Candidate	FPv%	1
Labour	R. Keane (elected Alderman)		
Independent	Jos. Brett (elected Alderman)		
Sinn Féin	P. W. Kenny		
Sinn Féin	J. D. Walsh		
Sinn Féin	J. O'Neill		
Independent	T. Cullen		
Quota:

=== Tower Ward ===
Tower Ward – 10 seats
Party	Candidate	FPv%	Count
Party	Candidate	FPv%	1
Irish Nationalist	O. Dawson (elected Alderman)		
Sinn Féin	P. Brazil (elected Alderman)		
Sinn Féin	P. W. Kenny		
Sinn Féin	W. A. Murray		
Sinn Féin	T. O'Neill		
Sinn Féin	M. Hennessy		
Sinn Féin	T. Hunt		
Independent	T. F. Jacob		
Irish Nationalist	E. Walsh		
WNHA	Mrs White		
Quota:

=== New Center Ward ===
New Center Ward – 8 seats
Party	Candidate	FPv%	Count
Party	Candidate	FPv%	1
Sinn Féin	T. Cullen (elected Alderman)		
Sinn Féin	P. Quinlan (elected Alderman)		
Irish Nationalist	Cunningham Jnr.		
Irish Nationalist	Cunningham Snr.		
Sinn Féin	William Cullinane		
Sinn Féin	R. Whittle		
Sinn Féin	James Power		
Labour	T. Dunne		
Quota:
