= 1920 Armagh Urban District election =

1920 Irish local government election

An election to the Armagh Urban District Council took place in January 1920 as part of that year's Irish local elections. The Local Government (Ireland) Act 1919 had seen elections for local government in Ireland change to a more proportional system. These changes meant little in Armagh however, which reverted to an older form of governance, with no seats being contested. Instead all the seats were filled by agreement.

== Results by party ==
| Party | Seats | ± | First Pref. votes | FPv% | ±% |
|---|---|---|---|---|---|
| Irish Unionist | 8 | | | | |
| Sinn Féin | 5 | | | | |
| Old Nationalist | 5 | | | | |
| Totals | 18 | | | 100% | — |
