= 1902 Dublin County Council election =

Local authority election in Ireland

The 1902 Dublin County Council election was held on 26 May 1902. Only four electoral divisions saw contests. The divisions of Lucan, Pembroke West, Rathfarnham, and Rathmines East had initially been expected to also see contests, however due to candidates withdrawing these divisions went without contests.

== Aggregate results ==
Dublin County Council election, 1902
Party	Seats	Gains	Losses	Net gain/loss	Seats %	Votes %	Votes	+/−
Irish Nationalist								
Irish Unionist								
ILLA								
Irish Republican								

== Ward results ==
=== Castleknock ===
Castleknock
Party	Candidate	Votes	%	±%
Irish Nationalist	Joseph Mooney	342		
	Joseph Goggins	65		
Majority		277		
Turnout				
Irish Nationalist hold		Swing		

=== Donnybrook ===
Donnybrook
Party	Candidate	Votes	%	±%
Irish Nationalist	Jeremiah Howard	355	57.44	
Irish Unionist	Samuel Worthington	263	42.56	▼12.26
Majority		92	14.88	N/A
Turnout		618		
Irish Nationalist gain from Irish Unionist		Swing		

=== Dundrum ===
Dundrum
Party	Candidate	Votes	%	±%
Irish Nationalist	William A. Rafferty	305		
	Patrick Kearney Jnr.	170		
Majority		135		
Turnout				
Irish Nationalist hold		Swing		

=== Lusk ===
Lusk
Party	Candidate	Votes	%	±%
	Joseph Richard Rooney	501		
	Francis Flanagan	442		
Majority		59		
Turnout				

=== Kingstown ===
Kingstown
Party	Candidate	Votes	%	±%
Irish Nationalist	Thomas Brown*	Unopposed	N/A	N/A

=== Swords ===
Swords
Party	Candidate	Votes	%	±%
Irish Nationalist	Patrick J. O'Neill*			
Majority				
Turnout				
