= 1914 Dublin County Council election =

Local election in Ireland

The 1914 Dublin County Council election was held on Monday, 8 June 1914.

Following the election P. J. O'Neill was elected Chairman. The election saw Nationalists take both divisions comprising Rathmines for the first time.

== Council results ==
Party	Seats	±	Seats %	Votes	Votes %	±%
Irish Nationalist	9	▲1	47.37	5,187	53.58	
Independent	8		31.58	717	7.41	
Irish Unionist	2	▼1	10.53	3,275	33.83	
Irish Labour	0	Steady	0.00	501	5.18	
Totals	19	Steady	100.00	9,680	100.00	—

== Division results ==
=== Balbriggan ===
Balbriggan Division Electorate:
Party	Candidate	Votes	%	±%
	Mr Arohdale Graham	Unopposed		

=== Blackrock ===
Blackrock Division Electorate:
Party	Candidate	Votes	%	±%
Irish Nationalist	William Field MP (incumbent)	965	72.89	
Irish Unionist	Frank Stokes	359	27.11	
Majority		606	45.78	
Turnout		1324		
Irish Nationalist hold		Swing		

=== Castleknock ===
Castleknock Division Electorate:
Party	Candidate	Votes	%	±%
	Mr P. Baggot	Unopposed		

=== Clondalkin ===
Clondalkin Division Electorate:
Party	Candidate	Votes	%	±%
Irish Nationalist	Christopher Hanlon (incumbent)	390		
Irish Labour	Chas Loughlin	184		
Majority		206		
Turnout				
Irish Nationalist hold		Swing		

=== Coolock ===
Coolock Division Electorate:
Party	Candidate	Votes	%	±%
Irish Unionist	Benjamin Newcombe	400	45.20	
Irish Nationalist	Joseph O'Neill (incumbent, Chairman of North Dublin RDC)	303	34.24	
Irish Labour	Michael Nolan	182	20.56	
Majority		97		
Turnout		885		
Irish Unionist gain from Irish Nationalist		Swing		

=== Dalkey ===
Dalkey Division Electorate:
Party	Candidate	Votes	%	±%
Irish Nationalist	Mr M. E. Judd (incumbent)	Unopposed		

=== Donnybrook ===
Donnybrook Division Electorate:
Party	Candidate	Votes	%	±%
Irish Nationalist	C. P. O'Neill (incumbent, Chairman of Pembroke UDC)	734		
Irish Unionist	G. R. Goodfellow	653		
Majority		81		
Turnout		1387		
Irish Nationalist hold		Swing		

=== Dundrum ===
Dundrum Division Electorate:
Party	Candidate	Votes	%	±%
	Mr James Collins (incumbent)	Unopposed		

=== Finglas ===
Finglas Division Electorate:
Party	Candidate	Votes	%	±%
	Mr P O'Reilly (incumbent)	Unopposed		

=== Kingstown ===
Kingstown Division Electorate:
Party	Candidate	Votes	%	±%
Irish Nationalist	Mr M. J. McAllister (incumbent)	Unopposed		

=== Lucan ===
Lucan Division Electorate:
Party	Candidate	Votes	%	±%
Irish Unionist	Captain Charles Nicholas Colthurst-Vesey (incumbent)	288	68.1	
Irish Labour	John Breen	135	31.9	
Majority		153	36.2	
Turnout		423		
Irish Unionist hold		Swing		

=== Lusk ===
Lusk Division Electorate:
Party	Candidate	Votes	%	±%
	R. A. Butler (incumbent)	Unopposed		
	hold			

=== Pembroke West ===
Pembroke West Division Electorate:
Party	Candidate	Votes	%	±%
Irish Nationalist	Mr James Mahoney (incumbent)	Unopposed		
Irish Nationalist hold				

=== Rathcoole ===
Rathcoole Division Electorate:
Party	Candidate	Votes	%	±%
	John Bagnall (incumbent)	543		
	Timothy C. Muldoon	174		
Majority		369		
Turnout		717		
		Swing		

=== Rathfarnham ===
Rathfarnham Division Electorate:
Party	Candidate	Votes	%	±%
	Mr Maurice Flood (incumbent)	Unopposed		
	hold			

=== Rathmines East ===
Rathmines East Division Electorate:
Party	Candidate	Votes	%	±%
Irish Nationalist	Michael L. Hearn	900	51.2	
Irish Unionist	J. C. Anderson	857	48.8	
Majority		43	2.4	N/A
Turnout		1,757		
Irish Nationalist gain from Irish Unionist		Swing		

=== Rathmines West ===
Rathmines West Division Electorate:
Party	Candidate	Votes	%	±%
Irish Nationalist	William McCabe	968	57.4	
Irish Unionist	Francis McBride (incumbent)	718	42.6	
Majority		250	14.8	N/A
Turnout		1,686		
Irish Nationalist gain from Irish Unionist		Swing		

=== Stillorgan ===
Stillorgan Division Electorate:
Party	Candidate	Votes	%	±%
	Mr A. K. O'Farrell (incumbent)	Unopposed		

=== Swords ===
Swords Division Electorate:
Party	Candidate	Votes	%	±%
Irish Nationalist	P. J. O'Neill (incumbent)	927	73.05	
Irish Labour	Thomas McLean	342	26.95	
Majority		585	46.10	
Turnout		1,269		
Irish Nationalist hold		Swing		
