= 1920 Limerick Corporation election =

Local election in Ireland

An election for Limerick City Council was held in 1920 as part of the wider 1920 Irish local elections.

The election saw Sinn Féin winning control of the council, with 26 of the councils 40 seats.

== Aggregate results ==
Limerick Corporation election, 1920
Party	Seats	Gains	Losses	Net gain/loss	Seats %	Votes %	Votes	+/−
Sinn Féin	26							
Labour	6							
Ratepayers	4							
Independent	4							

The result had the following consequences for the total number of seats on the council after the elections:

Party	Previous council		New council	
Party	Cllr	Ald	Cllr	Ald
Sinn Féin	0	0	21	5
Labour	0	0	3	3
Ratepayers	0	0	4	0
Independent	32	8	4	0
Total	32	8	32	8
Total	40		40	
Working majority	16	4	5	1
Working majority	20		6	
