= 1919 Sligo Corporation election =

Local election in Ireland

- 15 January 1919

All 24 seats on Sligo Corporation 13 seats needed for a majority
	First party	Second party	Third party
Party	Sligo Ratepayers Association	Sinn Féin	Irish Labour
Seats won	8	7	4
- Map showing results by electoral area
Council control after election
No overall control

An election for all 24 members of Sligo Corporation took place on 15 January 1919, using the single transferable vote (STV). The use of STV in Sligo in 1919 was the first use of a proportional representation electoral system to elect city councillors in the United Kingdom. For that reason, it was observed with interest across the United Kingdom, and it was commented on later as far away as western Canada.

At that time, Urban districts in Ireland held annual elections on 15 January each year, and under the Local Government (Ireland) Act 1898, plurality voting was used to replace a cohort of one-third or one-quarter of each city's councillors. Due to the First World War, elections in the years between 1915 and 1919 were suspended.

Sligo Corporation Act 1918
- Act of Parliament
- Parliament of the United Kingdom
- Long title: An Act to amend the provisions for the local management of the borough of Silgo and to extend the rating powers of the Corporation of the borough and to extend the power of the Corporation to borrow and re-borrow moneys and to provide for the payment by the Corporation of the expenses incurred in meeting the demands of the county council of the county of Sligo and to confer on the Local Government Board for Ireland further powers of control in regard to the performance of their respective duties by the Corporation and the officers thereof and to amend the provisions relating to the election and duration in office of the aldermen and councillors of the borough and for other purposes.
- Citation: 8 & 9 Geo. 5. c. xxiii

Dates
- Royal assent: 30 July 1918

Text of statute as originally enacted

The Sligo election was held under the Sligo Corporation Act 1918, a local act passed in the UK Parliament under the sponsorship of the Sligo Ratepayers Association (SRA), an alliance of Protestants and businessmen which opposed the actions of the outgoing corporation. The election under the 1918 Act was exempt from the general postponement.

Sligo was divided into three wards, each electing eight councillors. The SRA ran 18 candidates (11 Protestant unionists and 7 Catholic nationalists), six in each ward, and won 8 seats (electing five Protestants and three Catholics). It had support from four elected Independent councillors, for a combined total of 12 seats.

Sinn Féin, Labour, and a pro-Sinn Féin Independent Nationalist councillor won a majority, with a combined 13-seat total.

Sligo's use of STV was the second use of STV in an election in Ireland. The first occasion was to fill the Dublin University seats in 1918.

Sligo's election was seen as a success. The editor of the Sligo Champion newspaper wrote "It was really a model election. Throughout the whole process of counting and transferring, not one single mistake occurred. This is of course a tribute to the efficiency of the staff as well as to the manner in which every stage of the count automatically checks itself. It was very plain, very simple, and it means more for the elector than he was ever able to boast of before... It is a big improvement, and it is absolutely fair."

The election was seen as a vindication of STV. Subsequently, with the passage of the Local Government (Ireland) Act 1919, STV was adopted for all Irish local authorities. This came into effect for the 1920 local elections. The 1918 Act envisaged triennial elections in Sligo, as the 1919 Act did throughout Ireland. In the event, the Irish War of Independence, Irish Civil War, and their aftermaths meant the next local elections were not held until 1925.

== Results by party ==
Results by party
Party	Candidates	Seats	±	1st pref	FPv%	±%
Sligo Ratepayers Association	18	8		823	37.27	
Sinn Féin	13	7		674	30.53	
Labour	12	4		414	18.75	
Independent	5	5		300	13.59	
Total	48	24		2,208	100.00	—

(Candidate Hande is identified here as an Independent. In some accounts he is recorded as "Labour".)

== Results by Ward ==
=== East Ward ===
East Ward: 8 seats
Party	Candidate	FPv%	Count													
Party	Candidate	FPv%	1	2	3	4	5	6	7	8	9	10	11	12	13	14
Sinn Féin	Dudley M. Hanley		160													
Sinn Féin	Luke Gilligan		87													
Sinn Féin	Thomas H. Fitzpatrick		73	94												
Independent	Patrick White		71	83												
Labour	Michael Nevin		56	64	65	67	67	69	70	70	75	93				
Labour	James Gray		53	56	57	58	58	60	60	62	65	72	74	74	75	76
Sligo Ratepayers Association	Young Warren		51	52	53	53	55	55	58	65	65	65	66	66	98	
Sligo Ratepayers Association	James J. Nelson		41	42	42	42	42	42	43	48	49	50	50	50		
Sligo Ratepayers Association	Bernard McDonagh		35	39	41	42	43	44	46	48	49	50	50	51	63	79
Labour	William J. Reilly		25	28	30	31	32	32	32	32	36					
Sinn Féin	Henry Monson		23	42	46	47	47	49	51	52	56	61	67	68	70	70
Labour	Peter Costello		18	20	21	21	21	21	21							
Sligo Ratepayers Association	Hugh Sinclair		16	18	18	18	18	18								
Sligo Ratepayers Association	William Conmy		8	10	10	10	10	10								
Sligo Ratepayers Association	Thomas Mahon		5	6	7	7	7									
Labour	Bart O'Riordan		4	4	4	4										
Electorate: 946 Valid: 726 (%) Quota: 81

=== North Ward ===
North Ward: 8 seats
Party	Candidate	FPv%	Count										
Party	Candidate	FPv%	1	2	3	4	5	6	7	8	9	10	11
Independent	John Jinks		123										
Independent	John Lynch		72										
Sligo Ratepayers Association	Arthur Jackson		55	59	60	62							
Sligo Ratepayers Association	Henry Wood-Martin		53	55	55	56	57	59	60	60	61	61	61
Sinn Féin	Frank Nally		43	49	50	50	50	53	53	55	55	58	62
Independent	James Devins		32	46	47	47	47	49	49	54	54	55	57
Sinn Féin	James Costello		31	35	37	40	40	40	41	43	43	48	52
Sligo Ratepayers Association	James Campbell		30	35	35	36	36	37	39	39	39	41	44
Labour	Peter Heraghty		22	31	32	32	32	33	38	40	40	41	54
Labour	James Kelly		19	26	29	29	29	30	30	30	32	34	
Labour	Pat Derrig		15	15	15	15	15	15	15	16			
Sinn Féin	John Feeney		12	14	14	14	14	14	14				
Sinn Féin	William J. Kelly		12	14	16	16	16	16	18	18	19		
Sligo Ratepayers Association	Thomas Begley		9	11	11	11	11	12					
Sligo Ratepayers Association	Thomas Flanagan		7	10	10	11	11						
Sligo Ratepayers Association	John Noone		7	9	9								
Electorate: 769 Valid: 542 (70.48%) Quota: 61

=== West Ward ===
West Ward: 8 seats
Party	Candidate	FPv%	Count										
Party	Candidate	FPv%	1	2	3	4	5	6	7	8	9	10	11
Sligo Ratepayers Association	Henry Campbell-Perry		169										
Labour	Henry Depew		94	96	96	100	100	104	106				
Sligo Ratepayers Association	James Connolly		91	95	95	95	96	99	106				
Sligo Ratepayers Association	Percy Campbell Kerr		82	112									
Sligo Ratepayers Association	Edward J. Tighe		79	91	96	97	97	104	110				
Independent	William Hande		56	59	59	60	61	64	64	64	69	75	94
Sinn Féin	John Hughes		56	57	57	57	58	61	62	63	65	73	
Sinn Féin	William J. Feeney		55	56	56	56	59	61	65	65	71	86	90
Sligo Ratepayers Association	James Hamilton		51	53	54	56	56	58	71	75	77	80	89
Sinn Féin	Patrick J. Flanagan		44	44	44	44	46	46	47	47	61	78	107
Sinn Féin	Jordan Roche		40	44	44	44	45	46	48	48	59		
Sinn Féin	Samuel Tarrant		38	39	39	40	41	43	44	44			
Sligo Ratepayers Association	John Finan		34	37	38	38	39	40					
Labour	John Lambert		18	19	19	23	32						
Labour	Thomas D. Howley		18	18	18	20							
Labour	Andrew Thompson		15	15	15								
Electorate: 1,344 Valid: 940 (69.94%) Quota: 105
