= 1920 Fermanagh County Council election =

Local election in Ireland

The 1920 Fermanagh County Council election was held on Thursday, 3 June 1920.

== Council results ==
Party	Seats	±	First Pref. votes	FPv%	±%
UUP	9				
Sinn Féin	6				
Irish Nationalist	5				
Totals	20			100%	—

== Division results ==
=== Kesh ===
Kesh - 4 seats
Party	Candidate	FPv%	Count
Party	Candidate	FPv%	1
UUP	Edward Mervyn Archdale MP		
Nationalist	John McHugh		
UUP	Maj. J. G. Irvine		
Nationalist	J. McGrath		

=== Lisnaskea ===
Lisnaskea - 4 seats
Party	Candidate	FPv%	Count
Party	Candidate	FPv%	1
UUP	J. Porter-Porter D.L.		
Sinn Féin	Owen Hanna		
UUP	John Lendrum J.P.		
Nationalist	J. McLoughlin		

=== Newtownbutler ===
Newtownbutler - 3 seats
Party	Candidate	FPv%	Count
Party	Candidate	FPv%	1
UUP	J. W. Johnston		
Sinn Féin	James Coulson		
Nationalist	James McMahon		

=== Crum ===
Crum - 3 seats
Party	Candidate	FPv%	Count
Party	Candidate	FPv%	1
UUP	H. Kirkpatrick		
Nationalist	James McCorry		
Sinn Féin	J. Tierney		

=== Enniskillen ===
Enniskillen - 2 seats
Party	Candidate	FPv%	Count
Party	Candidate	FPv%	1
UUP	Cathcart		
UUP	Strathearn		
