= 1920 Antrim County Council election =

Local election in Ireland

Map of the results by electoral division

The 1920 Antrim County Council election was held on Thursday, 3 June 1920.

== Council results ==
Party	Seats	±	First Pref. votes	FPv%	±%
UUP	16				
Irish Nationalist	2				
Ind. Unionist	1				
Sinn Féin	1				
Totals	21		35,455	100%	—

== Division results ==
=== Antrim Electoral Division ===
Composed of the former districts of Antrim Rural, Ballyclare Rural, Ballynaorentagh, Ballyrobin, Ballygillan, Cargin, Carnmoney, Connor, Craigarogan, Cranfield, Crumlin, Donegore, Drumanaway, Dundesert, Glenavy, Kilbride, Randalstown, Rashee, Seacash, Sharvogue, Shilvodan, Templepatrick, Toome, Urban District of Ballyclare, Town of Antrim.

Antrim Electoral Division - 4 seats
Party	Candidate	FPv%	Count				
Party	Candidate	FPv%	1	2	3	4	5
UUP	Hugh Minford		2,166				
UUP	George McManus (incumbent)		1,366				
UUP	Alexander Lawther J.P.		1,013	1,514			
UUP	William P. Dickie		730	1,043	1,089	1,274	1,287
Nationalist	Henry Laverty		872	891	894	905	1,251
Nationalist	John O'Neill		432	449	450	452	
Electorate: 12,689 Valid: 6,579 Spoilt: - Quota: 1,316 Turnout: -

=== Ballymena Electoral Division ===
Composed of the former districts of Ballymena, Ahoghoil, Kells, Glen Rm, Galgorm, and Killoquin.

Ballymena Electoral Division - 6 seats
Party	Candidate	FPv%	Count						
Party	Candidate	FPv%	1	2	3	4	5	6	7
UUP	Robert Crawford (incumbent)		1,731						
UUP	John G. Wallace (incumbent)		1,508						
UUP	John Kinnear (incumbent)		1,357	1,446					
UUP	Lt. Col. John Patrick (incumbent)		1,079	-	-	1,201	1,290	1,573	
Nationalist	John P. McCann (incumbent)		1,003	-	-	1,007	1,147	-	1,176
UUP	John Adrain Junior		830	-	-	924	1,001	-	1,467
Independent	James D. Caruth		-	-	-	-	949		
Sinn Féin	John Clarke		-	-	-	-			
Independent	Alexander O'Hara		337						
	James McKenna		160						
Independent	Ellen Jane Gribben		105						
	Charles McAuley		103						
Electorate: 17,773 Valid: 9,945 Spoilt: - Quota: 1,421 Turnout: -

=== Ballymoney Electoral Division ===
Ballymoney Electoral Division - 4 seats
Party	Candidate	FPv%	Count							
Party	Candidate	FPv%	1	2	3	4	5	6	7	8
Sinn Féin	Louis Joseph Walsh	17.68	1,487	-	-	-	1,821			
UUP	Cpt. F. H. Watt (incumbent)	15.51	1,305	-	-	-	-	-	-	1,824
Farmers Union	W. W. B. Keers	13.21	1,111	-	-	-	-	-	-	1,809
UUP	James G. Leslie D.L. (incumbent)	13.11	1,103	-	-	-	-	-	-	1,619
Farmers Union	Andrew McAuley	9.46	796							
Farmers Union	Francis Black Junior	8.70	732							
Nationalist	Daniel McAlister	7.28	612							
UUP	Maj. J. A. Montgomery (incumbent)	6.23	524							
Irish Labour	Robert McMullan	4.68	394							
Farmers Union	William Stuart	4.14	348							
Electorate: 13,299 Valid: 8,412 Spoilt: 352 Quota: 1,683 Turnout: 8,764 (65.90%)

=== Carrickfergus Electoral Division ===
Composed of the former districts of Ballycor, Ballylinney, Ballynure, Cairncastle, Carrick, Fergus Rural, Eden, Glenwherry, Glynn, Islandmagee, Kilwaughter, Monkstown, Raloo, Temple Corran, Whiteabbey, Whitehouse, and urban districts of Carrickfergus and Larne.

In Carrickfergus the defeat of Edward Coey, an active member of Edward Carson's Advisory Committee, was an unexpected loss. Coey had been a member of the council since the first elections in 1899.

Carrickfergus Electoral Division - 4 seats
Party	Candidate	FPv%	Count			
Party	Candidate	FPv%	1	2	3	
UUP	Edward Coey Smith	27.99	1,330			
UUP	Alexander Miscampbell (incumbent)	21.89	1,040			
Ind. Unionist	Robert H. Wilson	20.02	951			
UUP	Samuel McMeekin	13.66	649	873	898	984
Ind. Unionist	Edward Coey (incumbent)	8.57	407	541	597	613
	William W. Morrow	7.87	374	395	403	
Electorate: 14,027 Valid: 4,751 Spoilt: - Quota: - Turnout: -

=== Lisburn Electoral Division ===
Lisburn Electoral Division - 3 seats
Party	Candidate	FPv%	Count			
Party	Candidate	FPv%	1	2	3	4
UUP	Harold A. M. Barbour (incumbent)	50.49	2,796			
UUP	William Fitzgerald (incumbent)		-	? (+857)	1,526	
Nationalist	Patrick Downing*		-	? (+23)	1,212	1,376
Ind. Unionist	Thomas Sinclair J.P.	10.94	606	677	Eliminated	
UUP	J. Stouppe McCance D.L. (incumbent)	9.71	538	834	860	1,002
Independent	Nicholas Best	2.29	127	234		
Electorate: 10,697 Valid: 5,768 Spoilt: 230 Quota: 1,443 Turnout: 5,998

- Patrick Downing was also reported elsewhere as being a member of Sinn Fein
- J. Stouppe McCance D.L. had served as the Chairman of the outgoing council
