= 1920 Londonderry County Council election =

Local election in Northern Ireland

Map of the results by electoral division.

The 1920 Londonderry County Council election was held on Thursday, 3 June 1920.

== Council results ==
Party	Seats	±	First Pref. votes	FPv%	±%
UUP	11		14,154	53.89	
Irish Nationalist	4		7,131	27.15	
Sinn Féin	4		4,423	16.84	
Ind. Unionist	0		557	2.12	
Totals	19		26,266	100.00	—

== Division results ==
=== Coleraine ===
Coleraine - 5 seats
Party	Candidate	FPv%	Count	
Party	Candidate	FPv%	1	2
UUP	D. H. Christie		1,149	
Sinn Féin	Eugene McGilligan		974	
UUP	H. O'H O'Neill J.P.		964	
UUP	William McCollum		927	
UUP	Robert Douglas		811	985
UUP	Jack Williamson		525	608
Electorate: 8,662 Valid: 5,350 Spoilt: 240 Quota: 892 Turnout: 5,590

=== Dungiven ===
The Dungiven Electoral Area comprised the District Electoral Divisions of Ardmore, Ballykelly, Ballymullins, Banagher, Bondsglen, Claudy, Drum, Dungiven, Eglinton, Faughanvale, Fenny, Foreglen, Glendermott, Glenshane, Lough Enagh, Lower Liberties, Myroe, Owenreagh, Straw, Tamnaherin, The Highlands, Upper Liberties, and Waterside.

Dungiven - 5 seats
Party	Candidate	FPv%	Count					
Party	Candidate	FPv%	1	2	3	4	5	6
UUP	John Morrison		2,483					
Sinn Féin	Patrick Lynch		2,037					
Irish Nationalist	Patrick McLoskey		485					
UUP	W. G. Webb		471	-	-	-	1,094	
Irish Nationalist	Thomas Cunningham		423					
UUP	John R. Scott		255	1,634				
Sinn Féin	John McHenry		148	-	-	-	-	1,050
UUP	J. Steele Hanna		103					
Sinn Féin	Edward Logue (withdrew post-nomination)		60					
Electorate: 8,600 Valid: 6,466 Spoilt: 230 Quota: 1,078 Turnout: 6,696

=== Magherafelt ===
Magherafelt - 5 seats
Party	Candidate	FPv%	Count				
Party	Candidate	FPv%	1	2	3	4	5
Irish Nationalist	Joseph Kelly Inniscarn	23.18	2,004				
UUP	Andrew Brown	19.49	1,685				
UUP	Hugh E. Thompson J.P.	17.71	1,531				
Irish Nationalist	Charles O'Hara	15.51	1,341	1,803			
Sinn Féin	John Walsh	13.92	1,204	1,302	1,303	1,304	1,665
UUP	A. L. Clark	10.20	882	884	1,126	1,214	
Electorate: - Valid: 8,647 Spoilt: 137 Quota: 1,442 Turnout: 8,784

=== Kilrea ===
Kilrea - 4 seats
Party	Candidate	FPv%	Count				
Party	Candidate	FPv%	1				
Irish Nationalist	J. E. O'Neill J.P.	25.47	1,478				
Irish Nationalist	James Mellen	24.13	1,400				
UUP	Robert J. Millen	12.53	727	(+64) = 791	(+14) = 805	(+107) = 912	(+212) = 1,124
UUP	W. J. Hilton	17.09	992	(+14) = 1006	(+11) = 1,017	(+377) = 1,394	
UUP	H. A. McIlrath	11.18	649	(+8) = 657	(+8) = 665		
Ind. Unionist	James Shiels	9.60	557	(+92) = 649	(+43) = 692	(+121) = 813	(+21) = 834
Electorate: ≈8,290 Valid: 5,803 Spoilt: 150 Quota: 1,161 Turnout: 5,953 (77%)

== Rural District elections ==
=== Derry No.1 Rural ===
Derry No.1 Rural - 9 seats
Party	Candidate	FPv%	Count
Party	Candidate	FPv%	1
UUP	James Cochrane		
Sinn Féin	John Patton		
Sinn Féin	John McLaughlin		
UUP	Robert Craig		
UUP	James Crawford		
Sinn Féin	William Doherty Junior		
UUP	Joseph McDermott		
UUP	Marshall McKay		
UUP	William Shannon		
