= 1920 Dublin County Council election =

Local election in Ireland

The 1920 Dublin County Council election was held on Monday, 7 June 1920.

The county was divided into four electoral divisions: Clondalkin (3 councillors), Kingstown (5 councillors), Rathmines (7 councillors), and Swords (4 councillors).

One of the most notable events of the election was the defeat of P.J. O'Neill J.P. in Swords. O'Neill had been Chairman of the council since its creation in 1899. Mr J. J. Lawlor, the outgoing Chairman of South Dublin RDC, was also defeated.

== Council results ==
Party	Seats	±	Seats %	Votes	Votes %	±%
Sinn Féin	12	▲12	61.16	11,320	59.87	New
Irish Labour	2	▲2	15.79	2,283	12.07	▲6.89
Irish Nationalist	2	▼6	10.53	1,440	7.62	
Irish Unionist	2	▲1	15.79	955	5.05	
Ind. Unionist	1	▲1	5.26	1,625	8.59	
Independent	0	▼	0.00	1,206	6.38	
WNHA	0	Steady	0.00	78	0.41	New
Totals	19	Steady	100.00	18,907	100.00	Steady

== Division results ==
=== Clondalkin Electoral Division ===
Clondalkin Electoral Division – 3 seats
Party	Candidate	FPv%	Count		
Party	Candidate	FPv%	1	2	3
Sinn Féin	Michael Costello	39.62	2,063		
Sinn Féin	James McNeill	36.01	1,875		
Sinn Féin	Cornelius O'Donovan	12.37	644	1,336	
Ind. Unionist	Lady Russell	4.21	219		
Independent	J. J. Lawlor (incumbent)	3.59	187		
Independent	Alfred B. Coyle (incumbent)	2.63	137		
Independent	S. C. Giltrap (incumbent)	1.57	82		
Electorate: - Valid: 5,207 Spoilt: 5 Quota: 1,299 Turnout: 5,212

=== Kingstown Electoral Division ===
Kingstown Electoral Division – 5 seats
Party	Candidate	FPv%	Count														
Party	Candidate	FPv%	1	2	3	4	5	6	7	8	9	10	11	12	13	14	15
Sinn Féin	Patrick Little	22.91	1,636														
Sinn Féin	Eoin MacNeill	21.18	1,512														
Ind. Unionist	Margaret Dockrell	19.37	1,383														
Irish Unionist	Patrick Merrin	8.43	602	-	-	-	-	-	-	-	-	-	-	-	1,080	1,156	1,238
Sinn Féin	James William O'Sullivan	7.10	507	-	-	-	-	-	-	-	-	-	-	-	1,120	1,202	1,484
Labour	Thomas Crimmins	7.55	539	-	-	-	-	-	-	-	-	-	-	-	812	893	
Irish Nationalist	William Field (incumbent)	6.60	471	-	-	-	-	-	-	-	-	-	-	-	698		
Irish Unionist	R. A. Potterton	4.94	353														
Labour	Edward Kelly	3.99	285														
Irish Nationalist	Michael Broderick	3.33	238														
Irish Nationalist	J. J. Kennedy	1.54	110														
Irish Nationalist	M. F. Judd (incumbent)	1.44	103														
WNHA	M. Fegan Redmond	1.09	78														
Independent	Charles McKernan	0.73	52														
Irish Nationalist	M. J. McAllister (incumbent)	0.63	45														
Ind. Unionist	R. E. Powell	0.32	23														
Electorate: 15,519 Valid: 7,140 Spoilt: 795 Quota: 1,322 Turnout: 7,935

=== Rathmines Electoral Division ===
Rathmines Electoral Division – 7 seats
Party	Candidate	FPv%	Count
Party	Candidate	FPv%	1
Irish Nationalist	James Mahoney (incumbent)		no contest
Sinn Féin	Thomas O'Connor		no contest
Sinn Féin	Michael Stafford		no contest
Sinn Féin	Christopher O'Kelly		no contest
Sinn Féin	George Walsh		no contest
Irish Unionist	Charles S. Dunbar		no contest
Sinn Féin	Alfred McGloughlin		no contest
Irish Unionist	William Beckett		no contest
Irish Nationalist	William MacCabe (incumbent)		no contest
Electorate: - Valid: - Spoilt: - Quota: - Turnout: -

Some of the Sinn Féin team formed an electoral group (The Cuala Group) as follows Alf McGloughlin, Thomas O'Connor, Christopher O'Kelly, Michael Stafford and George Walsh.

=== Swords Electoral Division ===
Swords Electoral Division – 4 seats
Party	Candidate	FPv%	Count
Party	Candidate	FPv%	1
Sinn Féin	Frank Lawless	39.32	2,266
Labour	Patrick Curran	18.71	1,078
Sinn Féin	H. J. Freel	14.18	817
Independent	R. A. Butler (incumbent)	7.25	418
Irish Nationalist	P. J. O'Neill (incumbent)	6.68	385
Labour	John Wilson	6.61	381
Independent	Arohdale Graham (incumbent)	5.73	330
Irish Nationalist	Michael Dunne	1.53	88
Electorate: 11,107 Valid: 5,450 Spoilt: 313 Quota: 1,153 Turnout: 5,763
