= 1920 Sligo County Council election =

Local election in Ireland

- 4 June 1920

All 20 seats on Sligo County Council 11 seats needed for a majority
	First party	Second party
Party	Sinn Féin	Ind. Nationalist
Seats won	20	0
- Map showing the area of Sligo County Council
Council control after election
Sinn Féin

An election to Sligo County Council took place on 4 June 1920 as part of that year's Irish local elections. 20 councillors were elected from 5 electoral divisions by PR-STV voting for a five-year term of office.

Sinn Féin won every seat for election, and also won a massive majority of the vote.

== Results by party ==
Party	Seats	±	First Pref. votes	FPv%	±%
Sinn Féin	20		13,617	91.92	
Ind. Nationalist	0		318	2.15	
Sligo Ratepayers Association	0		388	2.62	
Independent	0		491	3.31	
Totals	20		14,814	100.00	—

== Results by local electoral area ==
=== Ballymote ===
Ballinamore – 6 seats
Party	Candidate	FPv%	Count			
Party	Candidate	FPv%	1	2	3	4
Sinn Féin	Alex McCabe		1,056			
Sinn Féin	Bernard Conlon		1,040			
Sinn Féin	John J. McMorrow		944			
Sinn Féin	Thomas O'Donnell		868			
Sinn Féin	Michael Finn		322	439	684	
Sinn Féin	Michael Gray		316	523	607	841
Ind. Nationalist	Patrick McManamy		189	226	244	254
Independent	James Wynne		26	30	32	38
Independent	Patrick Gildea		15	23	31	42
Electorate: 9,285 Valid: 4,776 (51.44%) Spoilt: 145 Quota: 683 Turnout: 4,921 (53.00%)

=== Tubbercurry ===
Tubbercurry – 4 seats
Party	Candidate	FPv%	Count
Party	Candidate	FPv%	1
Sinn Féin	John P. Brennan	Unopposed	Unopposed
Sinn Féin	James Gilligan	Unopposed	Unopposed
Sinn Féin	John Mullarkey	Unopposed	Unopposed
Sinn Féin	Thomas Murricane	Unopposed	Unopposed
Electorate: 5,378

=== Dromore ===
Dromore – 4 seats
Party	Candidate	FPv%	Count	
Party	Candidate	FPv%	1	2
Sinn Féin	Michael J. Hanley		1,194	
Sinn Féin	John C. Clancy		914	
Sinn Féin	Dudley M. Hanley		818	
Sinn Féin	Daniel Kilcullen		687	1,086
Independent	A. J. Crichton		148	155
Ind. Nationalist	Peter Cawley		129	138
Electorate: 5,302 Valid: 3,890 (73.37%) Spoilt: 106 Quota: 779 Turnout: 3,996 (75.37%)

=== Sligo ===
Sligo – 6 seats
Party	Candidate	FPv%	Count				
Party	Candidate	FPv%	1	2	3	4	5
Sinn Féin	John Hennigan		1,256				
Sinn Féin	Patrick J. Rooney		957				
Sinn Féin	John Lynch		957				
Sinn Féin	Denis Leonard		876	Elected			
Sinn Féin	Laurence McHugh		707				Elected
Sinn Féin	James McGowan		705			Elected	
Independent	John Jinks		302				
Sligo Ratepayers Association	Percy Kerr		186				
Sligo Ratepayers Association	Henry Wood-Martin		126				
Sligo Ratepayers Association	Patrick Jordan		76				
Electorate: 8,077 Valid: 6,148 (76.12%) Spoilt: 203 Quota: 879 Turnout: 6,351 (78.63%)
