= 1920 Wicklow County Council election =

Local election in Ireland

The 1920 Wicklow County Council election was held on Friday, 4 June 1920.

== Council results ==
Party	Seats	±	Seats %	Votes	Votes %	±%
Sinn Féin	14		70	4,468	54.31	New
Lab-Sinn Féin	3		15	1,515	18.42	
Farmers' Association	2		10	1,395	16.96	
Irish Nationalist	1		5	518	6.30	
Independent	0		0	331	4.02	
Totals	20	Steady	100.0	8,287	100.0	Steady

== Results by electoral division ==
=== Arklow ===
Arklow - 6 seats
Party	Candidate	FPv%	Count											
Party	Candidate	FPv%	1	2	3	4	5	6	7	8	9	10	11	12
Sinn Féin	Felix O'Rafferty		575											
Sinn Féin	James Byrne		560	elected										
Sinn Féin	William Grainger		403	-	elected									
Labour-Sinn Féin	William Doyle		422	-	-	elected								
Sinn Féin	Andrew Kinsella		311	-	-	-	elected							
Farmers' Association	Daniel Condren		255	-	-	-	-	elected						
Independent	Arthur Bernard Brennan		197											
Farmers' Association	Robert Wynne Coates		242											
Farmers' Association	John Valentine Cahan		168											
Farmers' Association	George Thomas Hopkins		118											
Farmers' Association	Tobias Kinsella		157											
Sinn Féin	Daniel New		271											
Independent	Edmond C. Walsh		27											
Electorate: - Valid: 3,766 Spoilt: 229 Quota: 539 Turnout: 3,983

=== Baltinglass ===
Baltinglass - 4 seats
Party	Candidate	FPv%	Count
Party	Candidate	FPv%	1
Sinn Féin	Patrick Healy		uncontested
Sinn Féin	Daniel McEvoy		uncontested
Sinn Féin	John Joseph Metcalfe		uncontested
Sinn Féin	Edward O'Neill		uncontested

=== Bray ===
Bray - 5 seats
Party	Candidate	FPv%	Count				
Party	Candidate	FPv%	1	2	3	4	5
Sinn Féin	Joseph Campbell		488				
Labour-Sinn Féin	John Redmond		408				
Sinn Féin	Patrick Murphy		307	-	elected		
Sinn Féin	Joseph Lynch		284	elected			
Irish Nationalist	Martin Langton		276	-	-	elected	
Irish Nationalist	John Storey		122				
Electorate: - Valid: 1,885 Spoilt: 171 Quota: 315 Turnout: 2,056 (slightly over 50%)

=== Wicklow ===
Wicklow - 5 seats
Party	Candidate	FPv%	Count									
Party	Candidate	FPv%	1	2	3	4	5	6	7	8	9	10
Sinn Féin	Robert Childers Barton (Note: Barton, who was also MP for West Wicklow, was imprisoned in Portland Prison at the time of the election.)		643									
Labour-Sinn Féin	James Everett		588									
Farmers' Association	David H. Haskins		231									
Sinn Féin	Dulcibella Barton (Note: Dulcibella Barton withdrew from the election, although she withdrew too late for her name to be removed from voting papers.)		226									
Sinn Féin	Christopher M. Byrne (Note: Byrne was at the time on the run.)		221	-	-	-	440					
Farmers' Association	William Byrne		206	-	-	-	-	-	-	-	-	elected
Sinn Féin	Bernard Kelly		179	-	-	-	-	-	-	-	-	elected
United Irish League	James Byrne		120									
Labour-Sinn Féin	John Fleming		97									
	Andrew Halpin		86									
	Wilfred Tighe		21									
Farmers' Association	Richard Wilson		18									
Electorate: - Valid: 2,636 Spoilt: 277 Quota: 440 Turnout: 2,913
