= 1920 Armagh County Council election =

Local election in Ireland

The 1920 Armagh County Council election was held on Saturday, 5 June 1920.

== Council results ==
The results were as follows:

Party	Seats	±	First Pref. votes	FPv%	±%
UUP	14				
Sinn Féin	5				
Irish Nationalist	3				
Independent	1				
Totals	23			100%	—

== Division results ==
=== Armagh Electoral Division ===
Armagh Electoral Division - 3 seats
Party	Candidate	FPv%	Count
Party	Candidate	FPv%	1
Sinn Féin	Edward Donnelly	43.09	1,806
UUP	Edward Cowdy D.L.	29.06	1,218
UUP	Thomas A. McLure J.P.	26.18	1,097
Sinn Féin	James O'Reilly	1.67	70
Spoilt: - Turnout: -

=== Forkhill Electoral Division ===
Forkhill Electoral Division - 5 seats
Party	Candidate	FPv%	Count
Party	Candidate	FPv%	1
Sinn Féin	Frank Aiken		
UUP	J. E. Calvert		
Sinn Féin	Michael McArdle		
Sinn Féin	James McGuill		
Nationalist	James Murphy		
Spoilt: - Turnout: -

=== Keady Electoral Division ===
Keady Electoral Division - 3 seats
Party	Candidate	FPv%	Count
Party	Candidate	FPv%	1
Sinn Féin	Edward Hughes		
Nationalist	Hugh McGahan		
UUP	James Morrison		
UUP			
Spoilt: - Turnout: -

=== Lurgan Electoral Division ===
Lurgan Electoral Division - 4 seats
Party	Candidate	FPv%	Count
Party	Candidate	FPv%	1
UUP	John Johnston		
Nationalist	A. Campbell		
Independent	Dr. M. Deeny J.P.		
UUP	H. G. MacGeagh		
UUP	John Mahaffy		
Spoilt: - Turnout: -

=== Markethill Electoral Division ===
Markethill Electoral Division - 4 seats
Party	Candidate	FPv%	Count
Party	Candidate	FPv%	1
UUP	T. H. Hardy		
UUP	Dr. R. M. Quin		
UUP	William Byers		
UUP	W. J. Gibson		
Spoilt: - Turnout: -

=== Portadown Electoral Division ===
There was no contest in Portadown Electoral Division, as only 4 candidates were nominated for the 4 seats.

Portadown Electoral Division - 4 seats
Party	Candidate	FPv%	Count
Party	Candidate	FPv%	1
UUP	Peter Mackin		Uncontested
UUP	Elected		Uncontested
UUP	Elected		Uncontested
UUP	Elected		Uncontested
Spoilt: - Turnout: -
