= 1928 Irish local elections =

Nationwide local authority elections

- 23 June – 1 July 1928

All councillors across the Irish Free State
	First party	Second party	Third party
Party	Fianna Fáil	Cumann na nGaedheal	Farmers' Party
	Fourth party
Party	Labour

The 1928 Irish local elections were held in all the counties, cities and towns of the Irish Free State in June and July 1928, under the Local Elections Act, 1927. These were the first local elections contested by Fianna Fáil.

== Results ==
Party	Seats	±	First pref. votes	% FPV	±%
Fianna Fáil		n/a			n/a
Cumann na nGaedheal					
Farmers' Party					
Labour					
National Centre Party					
Independent and others					
Total				100	—

=== Detailed results by council type ===
==== County councils ====
Authority	FF	CnaG	FP	Lab	NCP	Ind.	Other	Total	Result
Carlow									
Cavan	10	2	4	0	1	12	4	33	No overall control
Clare									
Cork									
Donegal									
Dublin									
Galway	8	10	3	1	0	5	5	32	No overall control
Kerry	14	0	2	1	0	13	0	40	No overall control
Kildare	6	0	0	4	14	0	0	24	National Centre Party
Kilkenny									
Laois	7	0	1	19	14	0	0	27	No overall control
Leitrim	8	11	0	0	0	5	0	24	No overall control
Limerick									
Louth									
Mayo	16	17	0	1	0	4	0	38	No overall control
Meath	5	0	14	10	0	5	1	35	No overall control
Monaghan	5	0	0	0	0	12	11	28	No overall control
Offaly									
Roscommon									
Sligo	14	12	0	0	0	2	0	28	Fianna Fáil
Tipperary North	10	0	9	2	0	2	0	23	No overall control
Tipperary South									
Waterford									
Westmeath									
Wexford	1	0	14	9	0	3	0	26	Farmers' Party
Wicklow	1	0	12	9	0	6	0	28	No overall control
Totals									
Source: Irelandelection.com, The Irish Times archive

==== Borough councils ====
Authority	FF	CnaG	FP	Lab	NCP	Ind.	Other	Total	Result
Sligo Corporation	13	0	0	4	0	7	0	24	Fianna Fáil
Totals									
Source: Irelandelection.com, The Irish Times archive

== See also ==
- Local government in the Republic of Ireland
