= 1920 Kilkenny County Council election =

Local election in Ireland

The 1920 Kilkenny County Council election was held on Monday, 7 June 1920.

== Electoral areas ==
=== County council ===
Electoral area	No. of members	Townlands
Ballyragget	4	Attanagh; Balleen; Ballyconra; Ballyragget; Baunmore; Castlecomer; Clogh; Chogharinka; Clomantagh; Coolcraheen; Galmoy; Glashare; Johnstown; Kilkieran; Kilmacar; Lisdowney; Moneenroe; Mothel; Muckalee; Rathbeagh; Tubbridbrittain; Urlingford
Kilkenny	6	
Piltown	5	
Thomastown	4	

== Results by party ==
Party	Seats	±	First Pref. votes	FPv%	±%
Sinn Féin	16		11,114	74.05	
Labour	2		1,898	12.65	
Independent	1		1,996	13.30	
Totals	19		15,008	100.00	—

== Results by local electoral area ==
=== Ballyragget ===
Ballyragget Electoral Division – 4 seats
Party	Candidate	FPv%	Count	
Party	Candidate	FPv%	1	2
Sinn Féin	John Gibbons, Clomanto		1,220	737
Sinn Féin	James Conway		726	925
Sinn Féin	John Murphy		707	811
Sinn Féin	James Staunton		653	788
Independent	Captain R. H. Prior-Wandesforde, D.L., J.P.		255	260
Independent	Loughlin Harte J.P.		119	159
Electorate: - Valid: 3,680 Spoilt: - Quota: 737 Turnout: -

=== Kilkenny ===
Kilkenny Electoral Division – 6 seats
Party	Candidate	FPv%	Count								
Party	Candidate	FPv%	1	2	3	4	5	6	7	8	9
Sinn Féin	Ald. P. de Loughry		1,179								
Sinn Féin	James Brophy		619	678							
Labour	James Reade T.C.		576	612	629	636	652	784			
Sinn Féin	Patrick Corcoran		501	751							
Labour	Lawrence Walsh		474	491	496	499	521	555	557	646	646 - elected
Independent	Ald. J. Magennis J.P.		382	406	409	426	435 (eliminated)				
Independent	Ald. M. L. Potter J.P.		362	394	397	434	451	660	660	674	
Sinn Féin	Keiran White		274	314	344	356	566	578	583	586 (eliminated)	
Sinn Féin	James Grace		233	272	291	311 (eliminated)					
Independent	Edward Corr		90	101	104 (eliminated)						
Electorate: - Valid: 4,690 Spoilt: - Quota: 671 Turnout: -

=== Piltown ===
Piltown Electoral Division – 5 seats
Party	Candidate	FPv%	Count			
Party	Candidate	FPv%	1	2	3	4
Sinn Féin	Martin Walsh		630			
Sinn Féin	Richard Delahunty		550			
Labour	James Hogan		472	477	479	484
Sinn Féin	James Walsh		443	546		
Sinn Féin	Thomas Galavan		437	444	445	488
Sinn Féin	George Dooley		402	427	485	493
Electorate: - Valid: 2,935 Spoilt: - Quota: 490 Turnout: -

=== Thomastown ===
Thomastown Electoral Division – 5 seats
Party	Candidate	FPv%	Count					
Party	Candidate	FPv%	1	2	3	4	5	6
Sinn Féin	John F. Drennan		690	695	720	742	742	742
Sinn Féin	James Donovan		640	642	653	665	679	711
Sinn Féin	James Ryan		626	638	656	692	984	741
Sinn Féin	Robert Wallace		584	593	599	651	685	743
Labour	Patrick Ryan		376	382	384	400 (eliminated)		
Independent	Michael J. Murphy J.P.		299	309	323 (eliminated)			
Independent	Denis J. Gorey J.P.		296	305	331	458	463	473 (eliminated)
Independent	Roderick Gorman		122	125 (eliminated)				
Independent	Richard Murphy		71 (eliminated)					
Electorate: - Valid: 3,704 Spoilt: - Quota: 741 Turnout: -
