= Rathmines and Rathgar =

Former local government area in County Dublin

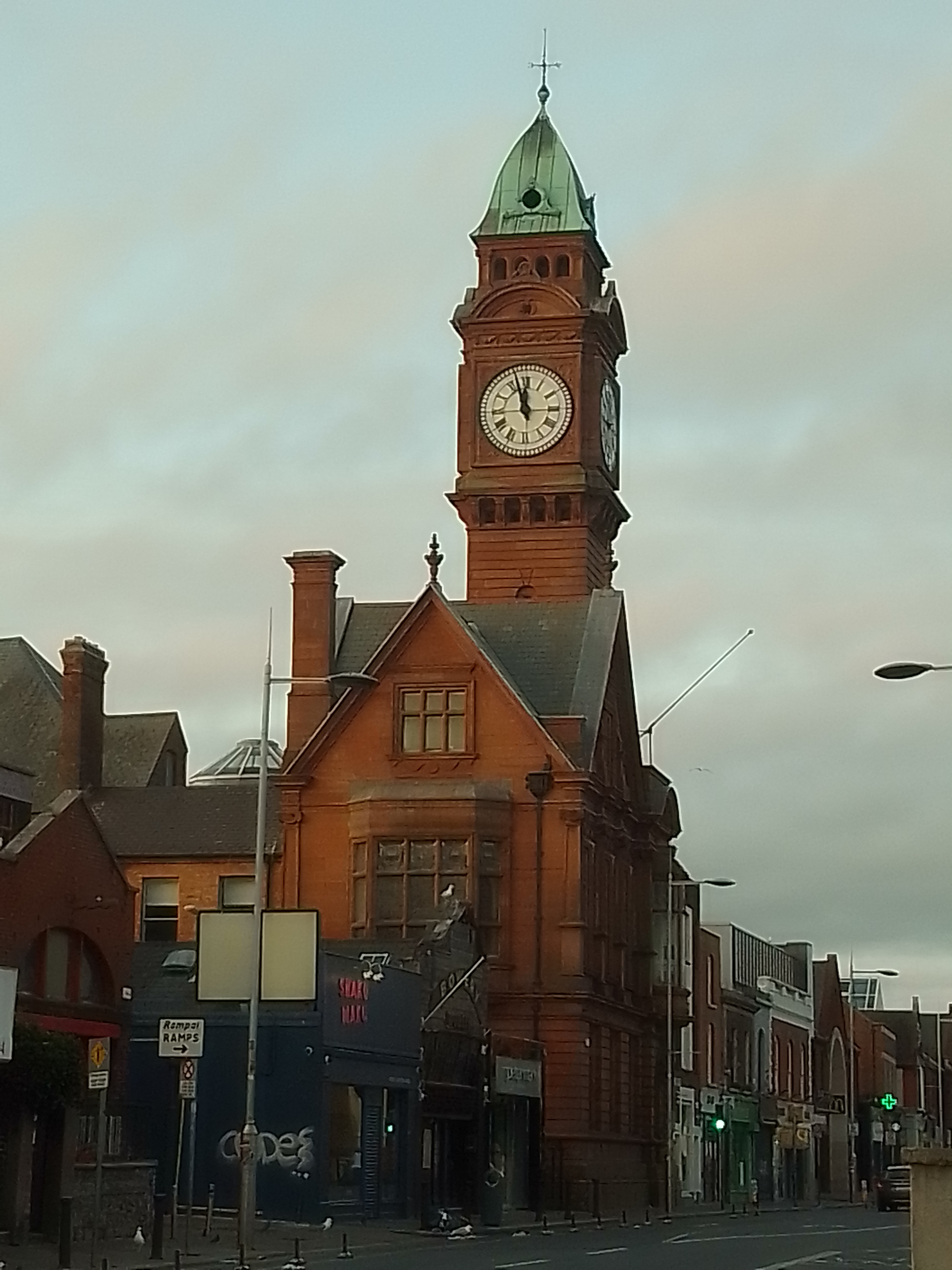
Rathmines Town Hall

Rathmines and Rathgar is a former second-tier local government area within County Dublin. It was created as the Township of Rathmines in 1847. In 1862, its area was expanded and it became the Township of Rathmines and Rathgar. In 1899, it became an urban district. It was abolished in 1930, and its area absorbed into the city of Dublin.

== Area ==
Flag of Rathmines and Rathgar Urban District Council (1929–1930)

The Township of Rathmines was created in 1847, including the districts of Rathmines, Mount Pleasant, Ranelagh, Cullenswood, Rathgar, and Harold's Cross. In 1862, it was extended further into Rathgar and took in the townland of Sallymount, and in 1880 took in the townland of Milltown. In 1899, it became an urban district under the Local Government (Ireland) Act 1898.

In 1930, the urban district of Rathmines and Rathgar and the urban district of Pembroke were abolished and the area added to the city of Dublin.

== Politics ==
At the 1920 Rathmines and Rathgar Urban District Council election, the Irish Unionist Alliance retained a majority on the council.

The urban district was at the core of the Dublin Rathmines constituency, created by the Redistribution of Seats (Ireland) Act 1918. It was in use only once, at the 1918 general election, at which Maurice Dockrell was elected on a majority. Dockrell was the only Unionist elected in a geographical constituency outside Ulster.

The area was part of the Dáil constituency of Dublin County from 1921 to 1937. After the abolition of the district, it was used with Pembroke as the basis of the Dublin Townships constituency, defined as "The area referred to in the Local Government (Dublin) Act 1930, as the added urban districts and also so much of the land described in Part III of the First Schedule to the said Act as is contiguous to the said area and also the townland of Clonskeagh." From 1948, that area was part of Dublin South-East.

== Town Hall ==
The township was based at 71 Rathmines Road; that building was demolished to make way for Rathmines Town Hall which was completed 1896.
