= Local Government (Ireland) Act 1919 =

Act of the Parliament of the United Kingdom

Local Government (Ireland) Act 1919 (Note: Section 13.)
- Act of Parliament
- Parliament of the United Kingdom
- Long title: An Act to amend further the Law relating to Local Government in Ireland and for other purposes connected therewith.
- Citation: 9 & 10 Geo. 5 c. 19

Dates
- Royal assent: 3 June 1919
- Commencement: 3 June 1919 (Note: The Acts of Parliament (Commencement) Act 1793.)
- Repealed: Republic of Ireland: 10 June 1965; Northern Ireland: 31 September 1985
Other legislation
Amended by	Local Government Act (Northern Ireland) 1922
Repealed by	Republic of Ireland: Electoral Act 1963; Northern Ireland: Local Government (Miscellaneous Provisions) (Northern Ireland) Order 1985

Status: Partially repealed

Text of statute as originally enacted

The Local Government (Ireland) Act 1919 (9 & 10 Geo. 5. c. 19) is an act of the Parliament of the United Kingdom which provided that local government elections in Ireland would be conducted on a system of proportional representation by means of the single transferable vote (PR-STV). This replaced the previous system of first-past-the-post in single-member districts and block voting in multi-member districts.

Sligo Corporation had introduced PR-STV under a local act of Parliament, the Sligo Corporation Act 1918, ahead of the 1919 Sligo Corporation election. The 1920 Irish local elections were the first elections under PR-STV in the rest of the country.

Under the Local Government (Ireland) Act 1898, Ireland had been divided into district electoral divisions and wards. Under the provisions of the 1919 Act, the Local Government Board for Ireland was required to divide the local government areas into local electoral areas, variously named as:

- county electoral areas, for the election of county councillors, in each county;
- district electoral areas, for the election of rural district councillors in each rural district, and for the election of urban district councillors in each urban district;
- borough electoral areas, for the election of aldermen and councillors, in each borough, including county boroughs;
- poor law electoral areas, for the election of guardians, in so much of every union as was situated in an urban district; and
- town electoral areas for the election of town commissioners, in each town.

The Government of Ireland Act 1920 enacted the partition of Ireland, creating separate jurisdictions of Southern Ireland and Northern Ireland in effect from 1921. It introduced PR-STV for the House of Commons of Northern Ireland and the House of Commons of Southern Ireland.

Southern Ireland became the Irish Free State in 1922 (Ireland from 1937). PR-STV has continued in use for all elections. The act itself was repealed under the Electoral Act 1963. The division of local government areas into LEAs has been re-enacted in later legislation (no longer distinguishing between types of LEA), up to the Local Government Act 2001.

In Northern Ireland, PR-STV was abolished under the Local Government Act (Northern Ireland) 1922, with a reversion to first-past-the-post for 1924 Northern Ireland local elections, the first local elections held in the new jurisdiction. FPTP was introduced for the Northern Ireland House of Commons for the 1929 election. PR-STV was reintroduced for local elections from 1972, and remains in use.
