= Nationalist Party (Ireland) =

Political party in Ireland

The Nationalist Party was a term commonly used to describe a number of parliamentary political parties and constituency organisations supportive of Home Rule for Ireland from 1874 to 1922. It was also the name of the main Irish nationalist Nationalist Party in Northern Ireland from 1921 to 1978.

== The Home Government Association ==
The Home Government Association was founded in 1870 by Isaac Butt, this was superseded in November 1873 by the Home Rule League and the Home Rule Confederation its British sister organisation.

== Home Rule League ==
It was founded under Isaac Butt in November 1873 as the Home Rule League. After the death of Butt the party soon divided into radicals led by Charles Stewart Parnell and Whiggish members under William Shaw. Shaw became leader for a year 1879–1880, but was defeated by Parnell the next year. The Whiggish members all lost their seats in 1885.

== Home Rule Party ==
The Home Rule Party was set up by a group of English Home Rule MPs' at a meeting in Dublin on 3 March 1874 to pursue the restoration of an Irish legislature.

== Irish Parliamentary Party ==
The party was reformed by Parnell as the Irish Parliamentary Party in 1882, the constituency organisation of which was the Irish National League. Both were commonly referred to as the Nationalist Party, as were the organisations which developed from the Parnellite Split, the majority anti-Parnellite Irish National Federation and the rump Parnellite Irish National League.

The Nationalist Party appellation was applied to the reunited Irish Parliamentary Party in 1900. It also covered smaller breakaway factions, such as those led by Tim Healy, D. D. Sheehan and William O'Brien. Some of its members were elected to Dáil Éireann in the early years of the Irish Free State as independents or for William Redmond's National League Party which was to merge into Cumann na nGaedheal. Bridget Redmond, William's wife, was elected in Waterford for Fine Gael until 1952.

== Nationalist Party (Northern Ireland) ==
After the general election of 1918, the term Nationalist Party was taken on by the remnants of old Irish Parliamentary Party under Joseph Devlin as the Nationalist Party in the new creation of Northern Ireland. It developed a reputation for being heavily disorganised and being little more than a collection of elected members with their own local machines. Many calls were made for the party to develop an overall organisation but it fell apart in the late 1960s. The party was eventually subsumed into the Irish Independence Party in October 1977.

== The party in Great Britain ==
In addition to the organisations in Ireland outlined above, the term Nationalist Party was also used to describe the party run in Liverpool by T. P. O'Connor, MP for the Liverpool Scotland division from 1885. It contested Liverpool City Council elections. After O'Connor's death in 1929, no candidate stood in the ensuing by-election to succeed him in the Irish Nationalist interest.

== Leaders ==
=== Home Rule League ===
- Isaac Butt 1874–1879
- William Shaw 1879–1880
- Charles Stewart Parnell 1880–1882

=== Irish Parliamentary Party ===
- Charles Stewart Parnell 1882–1891
- John Redmond (Parnellite minority) 1891–1900
- Justin McCarthy (anti-Parnellite majority) 1891–1892
- John Dillon (anti-Parnellite majority) 1892–1900
- John Redmond (reunited party) 1900–1918
- John Dillon March 1918 – December 1918 (lost his seat)
- Joe Devlin 1918–1921

=== Nationalist Party (Northern Ireland) ===
- Joe Devlin 1921–1934
- Thomas Joseph Campbell 1934–1946
- James McSparran 1946–1953
- Eddie McAteer 1953–1959
- Cahir Healy 1959–1965
- Eddie McAteer 1965–1973
- Fergus McAteer 1973–1977

== See also ==
- List of Nationalist Party (Ireland) MPs
