= Carnfunnock Country Park =

Public park in County Antrim, Northern Ireland

Coordinates: 54.8908°N 5.8466°W

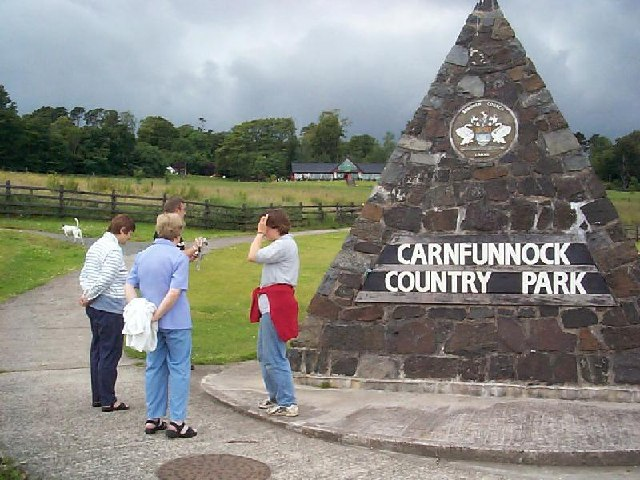
Carnfunnock Country Park, 2004

Carnfunnock Country Park is a 191-hectare park located between Drains Bay and Ballygally, near Larne, County Antrim, Northern Ireland. It is situated on the A2 Antrim Coast Road, 3.5 miles north of Larne. The park consists of mixed woodland, gardens, walking trails and coastline with views of the Antrim Coast and North Channel. and is owned and run by Mid and East Antrim Borough Council.

== Features ==
The walled garden with its sundials and wooden sculptures is open all year round along with a maritime themed outdoor adventure playground, golf driving range and academy, way-marked walks, orienteering course, geocaching, wildlife garden, public toilets and picnic sites. The Cafe also operates at weekends throughout the year and there is a Parkrun every Saturday morning (subject to ground conditions). 1st Carnfunnock Scouts, which belongs to The Scout Association, was formed in October 2015 and meets regularly throughout the year.

In 2010 the park was approved as a venue for civil marriage ceremonies and the first exchange of vows took place in August 2010.

In 2014, Outdoor Recreation NI produced a report called 'Options to enhance access with the creation of a natural heritage trail between Ballygally Village and Carnfunnock Country Park' highlighting the parks close links to Ballygally.

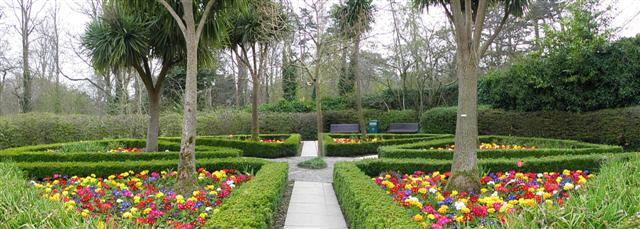
Garden

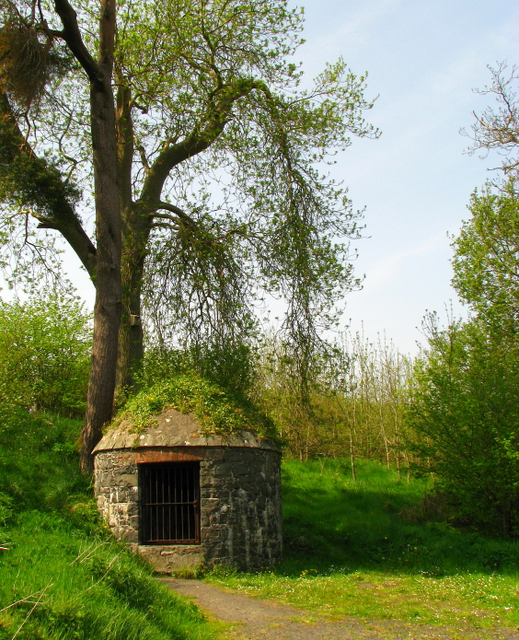
Ice house

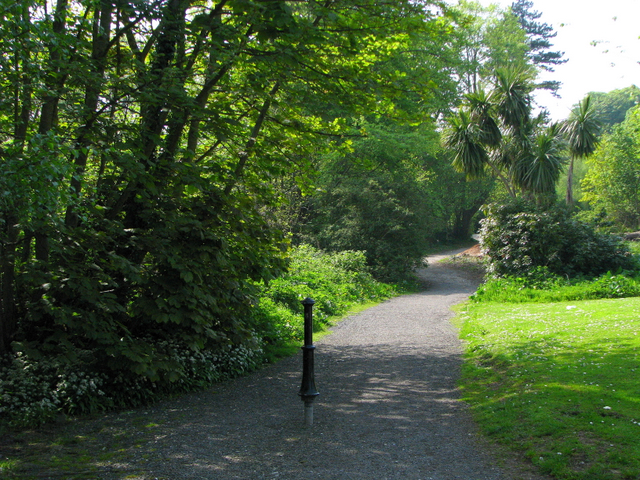
Walkway

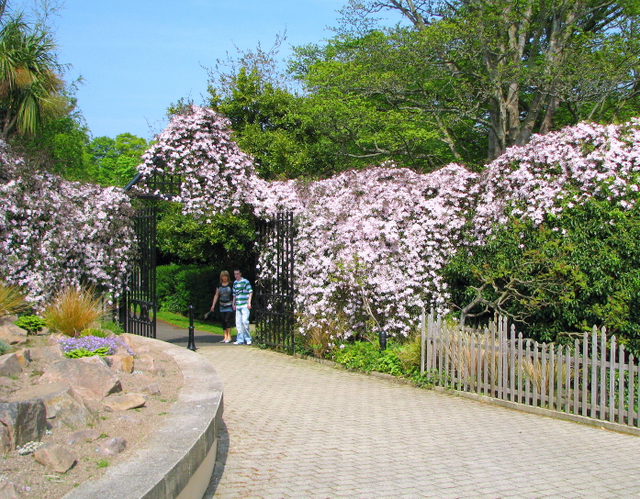
Gate

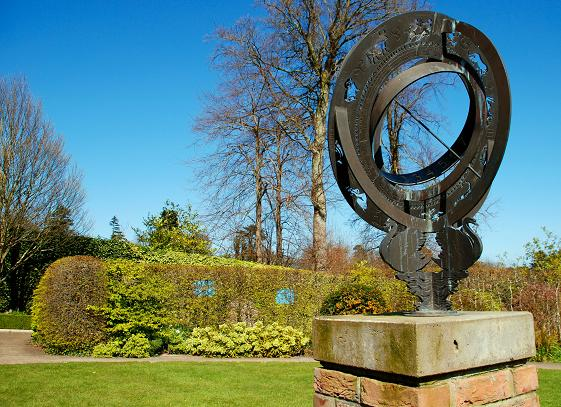
Sundial

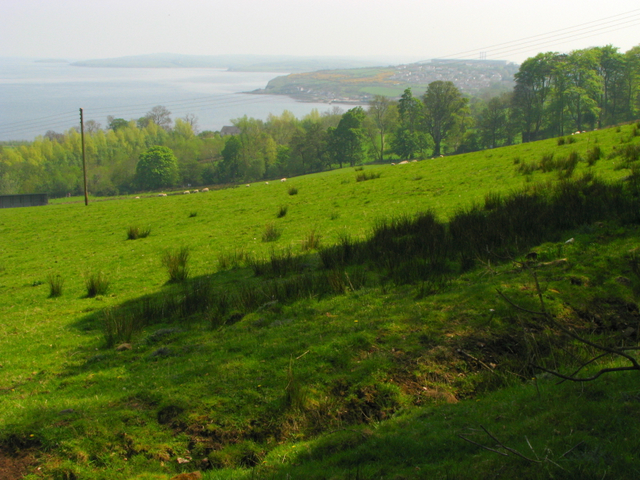
View towards Larne

=== Carnfunnock Maze ===
The maze is based on the winning idea from a 1985 Design a Maze competition: a hedge maze in the shape of Northern Ireland. It has seven central spaces, one for each county and one for Lough Neagh. The maze was planted out in 1986 with over 1,500 mature hornbeam (Carpinus Betulus).

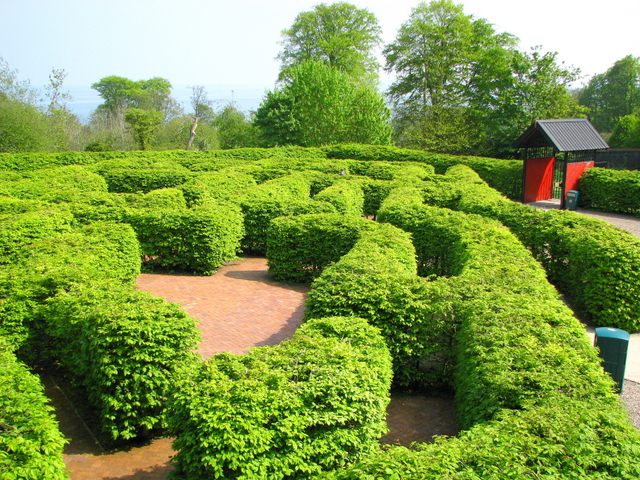
The Northern Ireland Maze

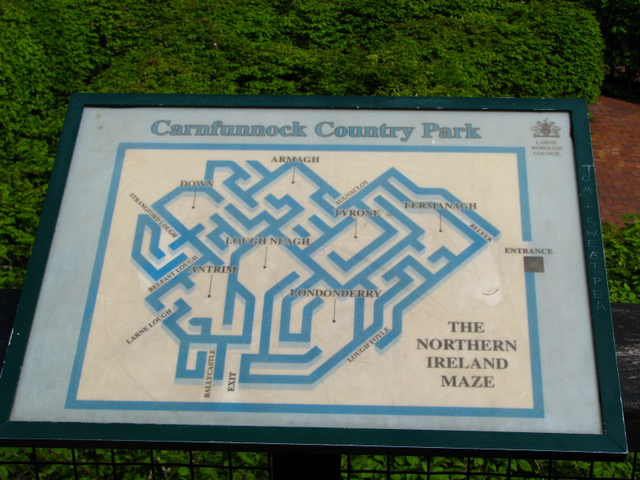
Map of the maze

== History ==
The presence of antiquities such as shell middens and Droagh motte show that there has been human habitation within this area going back hundreds of years.

However, it was not until 1823 that the Agnew family obtained the lease to this fertile land from the 2nd Marquess of Donegall and began farming in the area. The construction of the Coast Road (1832–1842) allowed two gentleman's residences to be built. One house was called 'Cairncastle Lodge' (now known as Carnfunnock) and the other was named 'Seaview' (now known as Cairndhu).

By 1865 Mr. James Agnew had fallen into financial difficulties and sold Cairncastle Lodge to the Chaine family. The Chaines lived here for over 70 years and were successful linen manufacturers who were responsible for the development of Larne Harbour.

In 1878 'Seaview' was sold to Mr. Stewart-Clark, a wealthy Scottish textile industrialist, who had married a local girl, Miss Annie Smiley and required an Irish residence. The Stewart-Clarks lived both here and in Scotland. Their daughter, Miss Edith Clark married Sir Thomas Dixon in 1906 and the Dixon family took ownership of Seaview in 1918.

When Cairncastle Lodge's last owner, Mr. William Chaine, died in 1937 leaving no children, the land was sold and merged with Sir Thomas and Lady Dixon's property. By that time Cairncastle Lodge was in poor condition and had to be demolished. The land was separated again in 1947 when the Dixon family generously donated Cairndhu to the Ministry of Health and Local Government. It opened as a hospital in 1950 and provided care for nearly 35 years. It is now in private ownership with a planning application submitted to turn the property into private accommodation.

At the same time, the Dixons held onto the Carnfunnock land and built a chalet bungalow where Cairncastle Lodge once stood. This gave them somewhere to stay whenever they visited the area. In 1957 Larne Borough Council purchased the 152 hectares of Carnfunnock land from Lady Dixon. This included the walled garden, chalet (which subsequently became the Larne Lions Club Holiday Home and was demolished in May 2015) and original estate features including the ice house and lime kilns.

Over the years the former Council (Larne Borough Council) developed this land with unique attractions, thanks to the assistance of various funding bodies and it was officially opened as a country park by the Duchess of Kent in July 1990.

For a full comprehensive history of both the Cairncastle Lodge and Cairndhu estates, including their associated owners a history guide can be downloaded from the Carnfunnock website. Copies are also available from Larne Visitor Information Centre, Mid and East Antrim Borough Council, Larne Museum and Arts Centre and Carnfunnock Country Park Visitor Centre.

== See also ==
- List of parks in Northern Ireland
