= Larne Museum and Arts Centre =

Larne Museum and Arts Centre is a local museum based in Larne, County Antrim, Northern Ireland.

Built in 1905, this historic building opened its doors to the public in 1906 as the Carnegie Free Library, following financial assistance from the American millionaire and philanthropist Mr Andrew Carnegie. The library was built at a cost of £2500 and was officially opened on 2 April 1906 by Colonel James McCalmont, M.P. The library eventually moved to larger premises on Pound Street in July 1980 at a cost of £205,000.

Larne Historical Centre first opened in the Reading Room of the Carnegie Public Library in 1972 following a campaign by local people for a museum which led to a grant of £300 from Larne Borough Council. In 1976 the Centre moved to the ground floor of Larne Town Hall before returning to the old Carnegie Library building in June 1983.

In 2005, to commemorate its centenary year, the building was restored and renovated, retaining many of its original features. The building is also now home to Larne Drama Circle and Larne Art Club.

The Main Gallery hosts permanent displays reflecting the agricultural, industrial, military and maritime history of the area. Larne is a principal gateway into Northern Ireland and the strong maritime links of this east Antrim coastal community are portrayed through a variety of exhibits relating to the first roll-on, roll-off ferries, the Royal Navy and the MV Princess Victoria disaster. Larne's rural hinterland, which includes two of the nine Glens of Antrim, is well represented in the museum's folk life display. The War and Conflict section hosts objects from the Home Rule Crisis, Larne Gun Running and the First and Second World Wars. Visitors can access accounts and memories of local people through oral history listening posts and can browse through photographs in a digital community archive.

The ‘John Clifford Gallery’ plays host to a variety of temporary exhibitions throughout the year. There are also a series of family events at the centre.

The temporary exhibitions gallery has been named after John Clifford, the first curator of the museum. John was a local actor, poet and musician. He left Larne in 1937 to take up a civil service post in London where he became a professional actor. He returned to live in Larne in 1967 soon taking on the role of librarian in Carnegie Library. Due to his love of local history, John became a founding member and Chairman of Larne & District Folklore Society which formed in 1968. The society helped in the campaign for a local museum which led to John becoming the first curator of Larne Historical Centre.

The museum is managed by Mid and East Antrim Borough Council, and forms part of the Mid-Antrim Heritage Partnership alongside similar local museums in Ballymena, Carrickfergus and Newtownabbey.
