= Drains Bay =

Village in County Antrim, Northern Ireland

Coordinates: 54°52′N 5°50′W

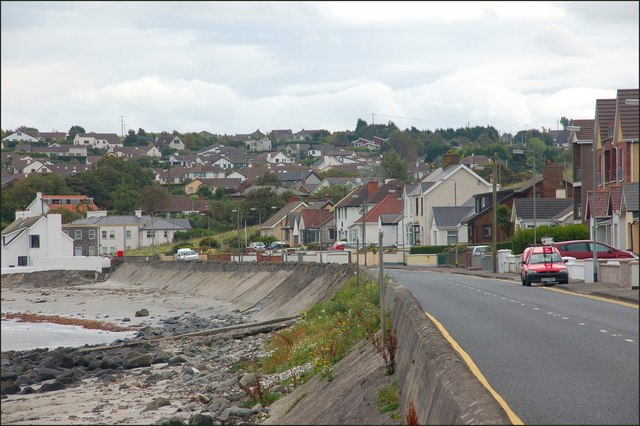
Drains Bay, looking south

Drains Bay (possibly from Irish Draighean, meaning 'blackthorn' + English "bay") is a small residential and commuter settlement about 3 kilometres (1.9 mi) north of Larne and south of Ballygalley on the coast of County Antrim, Northern Ireland.

The village is mainly residential with a mix of retired people and young families living there. Some residents commute to Larne by car or bus and to Belfast by car or by train or bus (from Larne). Drains Bay beach is popular with dog walkers and can be accessed at its southern end via steps or northern end grass verge. At its northern end there is also a carpark area with benches, public toilets, picnic tables and a play area for children. On the other side of the settlement are hills popular with walkers, hikers and also landscape painters. There are no shops in Drains Bay, but it is visited by mobile food vendors at weekends.

To the north of Drains Bay lies Carnfunnock Country Park and Ballygally
