= Ballygally Castle =

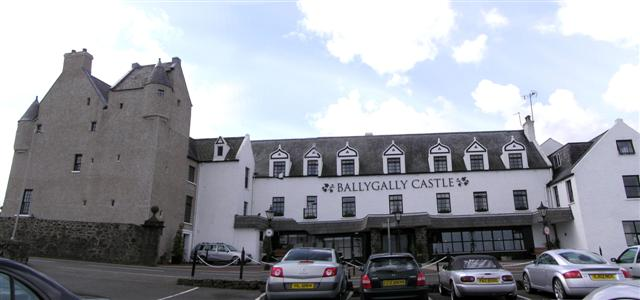
- Front façade of Ballygally Castle Hotel

- Location within Northern Ireland

General information
- Type: Castle
- Location: Ballygally, County Antrim, Northern Ireland
- Coordinates: 54°53′56″N 5°51′40″W
- Completed: 1625
- Owner: Hastings Hotels

Design and construction
- Architect: James Shaw

Ballygally Castle is in the village of Ballygally, County Antrim, Northern Ireland, located approximately 3 miles (5 kilometres) north of Larne. The castle overlooks the sea at the head of Ballygally Bay. It is now run as a hotel and is reputed to be one of the most haunted places in Ulster.

== History ==
The castle was built in 1625 by James Shaw of Scotland, who had come to the area and rented the land from Randal MacDonnell, the Catholic Earl of Antrim for £24 a year. Although it is sometimes claimed to be the oldest occupied building in Ireland, Castle Upton is somewhat older. Over the main entrance door to the castle, leading to the tower, is the Middle Scots inscription "Godis Providens is my Inheritans". The bawn and walled garden are registered as Scheduled Historic Monuments at grid ref: D3725 0781.

During the Great Rebellion of 1641, the Irish garrison stationed at Glenarm tried to take the castle, then more fortified than today, several times but without success.

In the late 1730s, the Shaw children were tutored by the later pioneering educator and master of a Belfast "play school", David Manson. For many years, one of the apartments in the castle was known as the "Manson room".

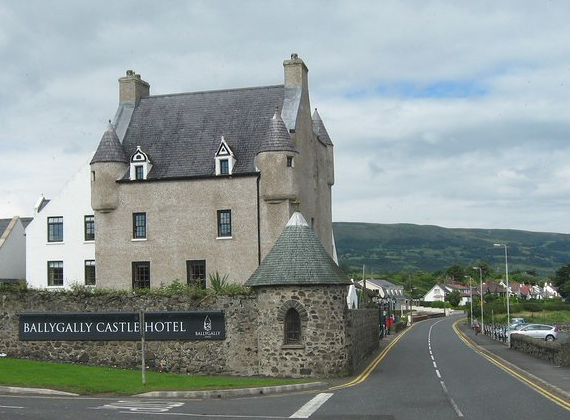
Ballygally Castle

Around 1760, the castle buildings were extended as the squire, Henry Shaw, married a Miss Hamilton, who had two sisters and who all came to live within the castle.

In 1799, the castle passed to William Shaw, the last squire of Ballygally. The family's wealth was exhausted, and within a few years he sold the property. It then passed through several hands, including use as a coastguard station, before being purchased in the early 1950s by Cyril Lord. The textile millionaire refurbished the castle as the hotel seen today.

Paranormal enthusiasts, such as Jeff Belanger, suggest that the castle is haunted.

== Architecture ==
The rectangular Scottish baronial-style castle has four storeys, walls of about 1.5 metres thick, four corner turrets and a flanking tower at the northeast side with an entrance and stone spiral stairs. Originally it was enclosed by a bawn with four corner turrets. In the 1840s, the side nearest the sea was removed to accommodate the new coast road.

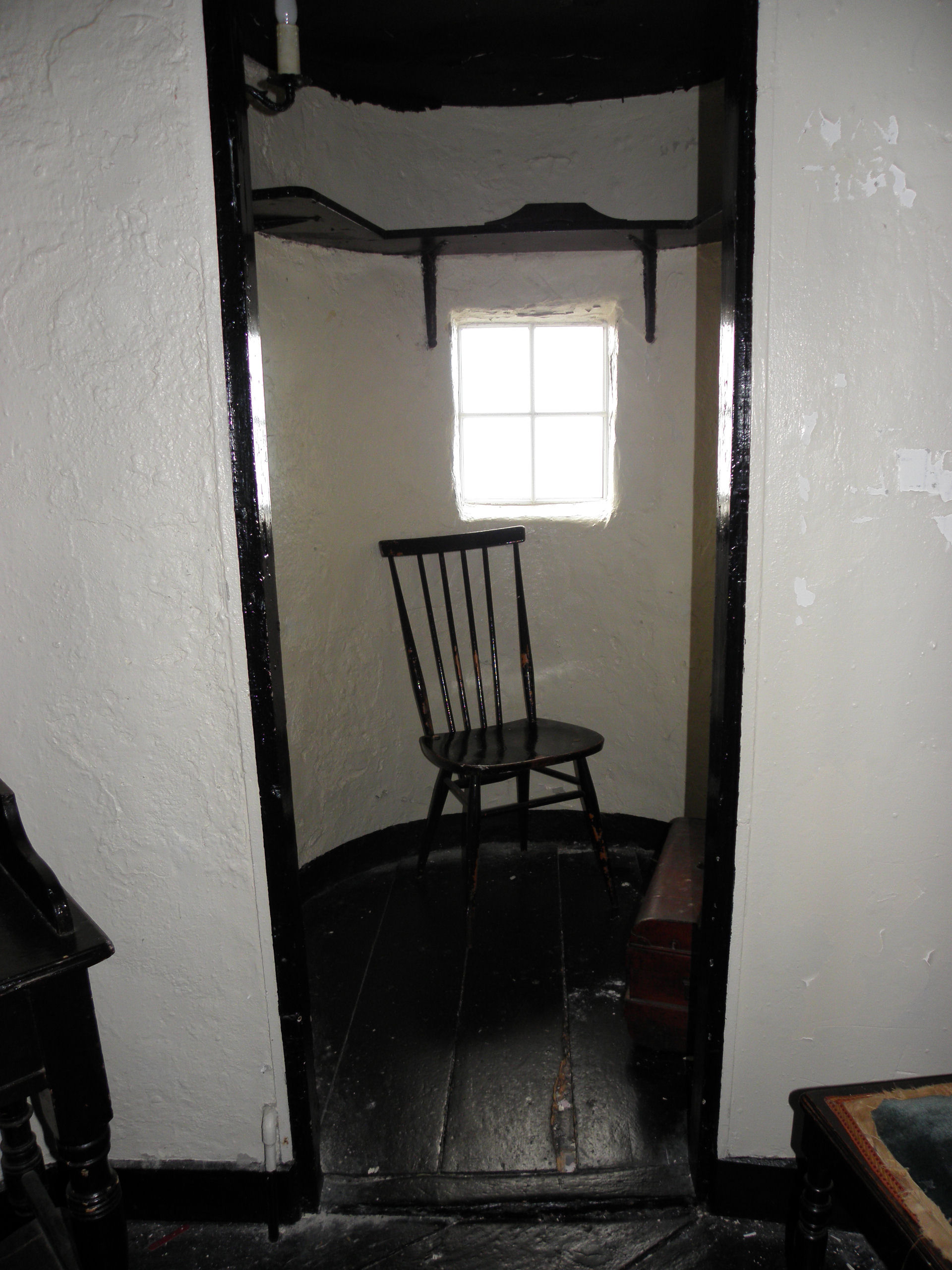
Turret Room

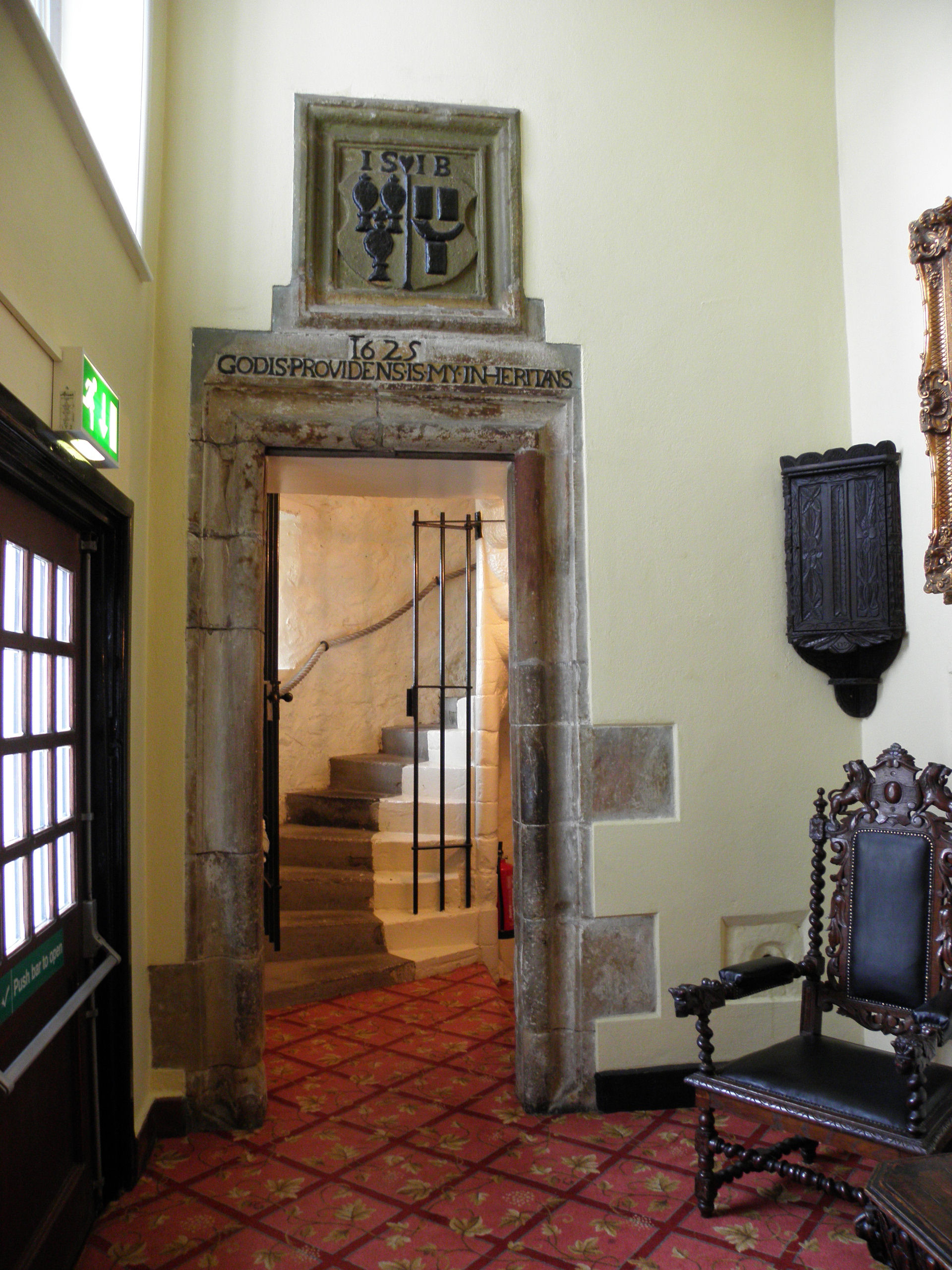
Staircase

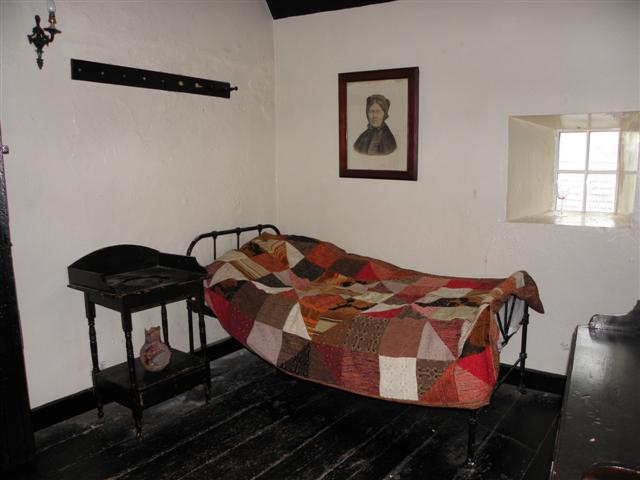
Ghost Room

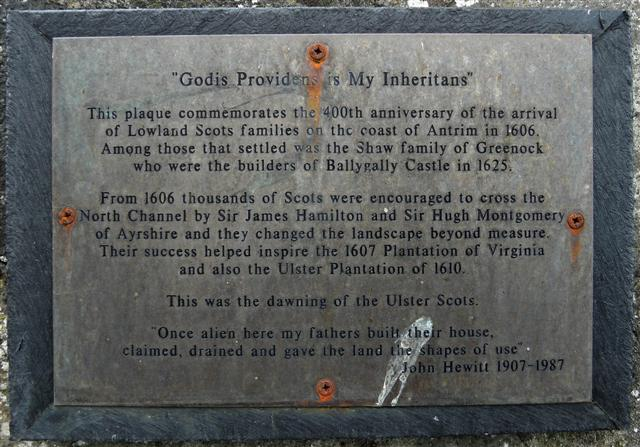
Plaque

== See also ==
- Castles in Northern Ireland
- List of castles in Ireland
