= Lemuel Mathews =

Welsh Anglican priest

Lemuel Mathews, D.D. was a Welsh Anglican priest in Ireland during the second half of the 17th and early 18th century.

Mathews was born in Swansea and educated at Lincoln College, Oxford. He was Chaplain to Jeremy Taylor, Bishop of Down and Connor from 1661 to 1667. Taylor appointed him the incumbent at Glenavy. In 1666 he became Prebendary of Carncastle in Lisburn Cathedral; and the following year Archdeacon of Down. He became Vicar General of the diocese in 1690. In 1693 a Special Visitation deprived him of all his ecclesiastical offices. Mathews then spent many years trying to regain his positions, but was only successful with his prebend at Carncastle.
