= Larne Grammar School =

Location
- Lower Cairncastle Road; Larne, County Antrim, BT40 1PQ; Northern Ireland
- Coordinates: 54.853364°N 5.832063°W

Information
- Type: Grammar
- Motto: "Pollicitis addere facta" Fulfil your promise
- Religious affiliation: Integrated Christian
- Established: 1886
- Founders: Sir Edward Coey; Mr. John Crawford
- Local authority: Education Authority
- Chairman of Board of Governors: Roy Logan
- Head teacher: Johnathan Wylie
- Staff: 50
- Gender: Co-educational
- Age: 11 to 18
- Enrolment: 760
- Houses: Curran, Drumalis, Gardenmore, Inver
- Colours: Navy blue and maroon
- Publication: The Grammarian
- Former Pupils: Grammarians
- Website: http://www.larnegrammar.co.uk

Larne Grammar School is a co-educational voluntary grammar school located in Larne, County Antrim, Northern Ireland. Founded in 1886 by Sir Edward Coey and John Crawford, it has around 760 pupils and 50 teaching staff.

== History ==
The school was opened by Mr. John Crawford and Sir Edward Coey in 1887. Mr. R.M. Jones M.A. opened the school to its first pupils. Larne Grammar School was set up as an all boys fee paying and boarding school. During the school's first 20 years, very few pupils attended, and the school was threatened to be closed on numerous occasions. The school temporarily closed between 1914 and 1918 due to the outbreak of World War One. In 1922, Larne Grammar School merged with Larne Girls' School, and a Preparatory Department was established. Larne Grammar began to grow, with more and more pupils joining the voluntary school. During the early 1970s, the school was extended to accommodate the growing number of pupils. 19 new classrooms, a sports hall and changing rooms were built to the rear of the school. During the leadership of Headmaster D.J. Thompson, the original school building was demolished and replaced by a new school in 1987. 22 new classrooms, a new sports hall, new staff offices and a new canteen were built, as well as a new atrium, reception and Headmaster Suite. The extension from 1972 remained, but was refurbished. The original assembly hall was retained and still remains today. In 2001, under the command of John Wilson, a new Technology and Design Department was established. The new building consists of two classrooms with workshops, offices and lavatories. The building has solar panels and provides all of the energy required to power the entire school. Furthermore, a new Music Department was constructed towards the rear of the building, with a large classroom, offices and tuition rooms. To celebrate the 125th Anniversary of Larne Grammar School, a new astro-turf hockey pitch, four tennis courts and a new pavilion were built. All classrooms have been fully refurbished during the 2012/13 school year, with new equipment being added such as Apple Computers, new desks and new chairs; all of which under the orders of new Headmaster Jonathan Wylie.

Name	Year of Appointment	Year of Withdrawal
Headmaster R.M. Jones	1888	1891
Headmaster William Dawson	1891	1900
Headmaster William Smith Johnson	1900	1903
Headmaster James MacQuillan	1904	1937
Headmaster John W. Darbyshire	1937	1943
Headmaster Ronald Henry Davies	1943	1950
Headmaster Joseph Alan Stewart	1950	1973
Headmaster D.J. Thompson	1973	1989
Headmaster H.M. Morrow	1989	2001
Headmaster John Wilson	2001	2012
Headmaster Jonathan Wylie	2012	Present

== Academics ==
The school was inspected in November 2000 by the Department of Education. The following strengths were identified:

- Exemplary behaviour and motivation of the pupils
- Many instances of good teaching
- High standards achieved by many of the pupils
- Good accommodation.

With J Wilson as headmaster, the school flourished with pupils gaining an overall excellent standard of teaching with GCSE and A Level grades much higher than the Northern Ireland average, which has the highest average throughout the UK. To enroll at the school, pupils go through several selection processes to ensure that all pupils have a high academic standard.

== Curriculum ==
Key Stage 3: Years 8-10
Art & Design	French	ICT	Physical Education	Technology & Design
Biology	Geography	Learning for Life & Work	Physics	
Chemistry	History	Mathematics	Religious Studies	
English	Home Economics	Music	Spanish	

- Bold subjects are compulsory

GCSE: Years 11–12
Additional Mathematics	Chemistry	English Literature	History	Music	Religious Studies (Long Course)
Art & Design	Classical Civilisation	French	Home Economics	Physical Education	Spanish
Biology	Geography	ICT	Physics	Technology & Design	
Business Studies	English Language	Mathematics	Religious Studies (Short Course)	Motor Vehicle Studies	

- Bold subjects are compulsory

AS & A2 Level: Years 13–14
Accounting	Business Studies	French	Home Economics	Performing Arts	Sport
Applied Business Studies	Chemistry	Further Mathematics	Human Biology	Physical Education	Technology & Design
Applied Mathematics	Computing	Geography	ICT	Physics	
Applied Science	Classical Civilisation	Health & Social Care	Law	Psychology	
Art & Design	Engineering	History	Mathematics	Religious Studies	
Biology	English Literature	History of Music	Music	Spanish	

== Teaching Staff ==
Larne Grammar School has 60 teachers and 772 pupils, giving the school a pupil teacher ratio of 12.7 pupils per teacher, which is much lower than the Northern Ireland average of 15.6 for Grammar Schools, and 16.8 for all schools delivering secondary education.

All subjects have at least two teachers, with many having more. All teachers are able to teach at least one subject to A level, with many able to do so with two subjects.

== Extracurricular activities ==
Department of Music

- Orchestra
- Woodwind Group
- Brass Group
- String Group
- Traditional Irish Group
- Jazz Band
- Music Theory Club
- Music Appreciation Society
- Junior Choir
- Senior Choir
- Chamber Choir
- Choral Group
- Music Lessons in the following instruments;
- -Brass:Trumpet, Cornet, E-Flat Tenor, French Horn, Horn, Baritone, Euphonium, Tuba, Trumbone
- -Woodwind: Clarinet, Flute, Saxophone
- -String: Violin, Viola, Cello, Double Bass
- -Percussion: Drum Kit, Side Drum
- -Other: Guitar, Piano, Voice

Department of Physical Education and Sport

- Rugby
- Hockey
- Badminton Club
- Tennis Club
- Netball Club
- Volleyball Club
- Basketball Club
- Rowing Club
- Dance and Fitness Club
- Dance Club
- Fitness Club
- Cross Country Club
- Athletics Club
- Walking Club
- Yoga Club

Department of the Environment

- Conservation Society

English Department

- Club of Literature
- Debating Society
- Drama Club
- Junior Reading Club
- Senior Reading Club

Modern Languages Department

- French Club
- Spanish Club

Technology and Design Department

- Remote Control Car Club

Other

- Charity Committee
- Homework Club
- Photography Club

== Sport ==
=== Hockey ===
In 2000, the School won the Ulster Senior Schoolgirls' Hockey Cup, an annual competition competed for by schools affiliated to the Ulster Women's Hockey Union, by beating Ballymena Academy 2–1 in the final.

In 2022, the school's 1st XI Hockey Team were crowned Super League 'Tier B' Champions following a final against Grosvenor Grammar School, where Larne Grammar School won 3-0.

=== Rugby ===
The 1st XV have reached the final of the Subsidiary Shield competition of the Ulster Schools Cup on three occasions in 1981, 1991 and 1992, but lost on each occasion.

On 9 March 2007, the 1st XV rugby team won the Schools Trophy by beating Omagh Academy 11–3 in the final. They won it again on 22 February 2008, beating Dalriada 12–0 in the final.

At junior level, the school Medallion XV were finalists in the Medallion Shield in 1955. The team won the subsidiary Medallion Plate in 1987 and were runners up in the Plate in 1998 and 1999. The lowest of the subsidiary competitions, the Medallion Trophy, was won in 2008 when Downshire High School were narrowly defeated by 13–12 in the final.

=== Athletics ===
In the summer of 2008, the school senior boys 4 × 100 m team qualified from the Ulster heats to reach the All Ireland School Athletics Finals. The team won the title in a time of 43.67 seconds, less than a tenth ahead of second place Castleknock College. In 2009 the team retained the title, making them only the 6th school to ever do so.

== Notable former pupils ==
- Dr Norman Apsley, Chief Executive of the Catalyst Inc
- Dianne Barr, Paralympic gold medalist
- Stafford Carson, former Moderator of the Presbyterian Church in Ireland
- Dave Clements, footballer and football manager
- William Craig, politician
- Frederick Girvan, Justice of the High Court of Northern Ireland and member of the Privy Council
- Robert John Gregg, Pioneer of the academic study of Ulster-Scots dialects as well as a linguistic authority on Canadian English
- Mark Haggan, Charity activist and businessman
- Sir John Hermon Chief Constable of the Royal Ulster Constabulary
- Stephen Hilditch, former Headmaster of Belfast High School and former international rugby union referee from 1984 to 1995.
- Gareth McAuley. Professional Footballer
- Ayeisha McFerran, Irish Hockey International
- Emma McIlroy, Founder and CEO of the Wildfang fashion brand
- James McIlroy, British Olympian
- Phillip Magee, X Factor series 2 finalist
- Gareth Maybin, professional golfer
- Julie Nelson, International Footballer
- Jonathan Rea, motorcycle racer
- Trevor Ringland, former British and Irish Lions international rugby player, Northern Irish politician, and co-chairman of the NI Conservatives.
- Professor Sir Terence Stephenson consultant paediatrician at UCL and chair of the General Medical Council
- Raymond Snoddy, journalist and media commentator
- Claire Taggart, British Paralympian and Boccia World Champion
- Professor David Williams, astrochemist at University College London
