= Edmund Leslie =

Anglican priest in Ireland (1735 - 1796)

Edmund Leslie (1735 - 1796) was an Anglican priest in Ireland during the 18th century.

Benson was born in Dublin and educated at Trinity College, Dublin. He was Prebendary of Carncastle in Lisburn Cathedral from 1781 to 1784; and Archdeacon of Down from 1782 until his death.
