= March 2013 United Kingdom winter storm =

Weather event in the UK and Ireland

- Snow in Cumbria on 23 March.

Meteorological history
- Formed: 15 March 2013
- Dissipated: 25 March 2013

Blizzard
- Lowest pressure: 970 hPa (mbar); 28.64 inHg

Overall effects
- Casualties: at least 2
- Areas affected: Wales, Northern England, Northern Ireland, Southern Scotland
- Part of the Spring 2013 United Kingdom cold spell

A winter storm took place in the United Kingdom and Ireland on the night of 22–23 March 2013. Described as 'the worst snowfall for 30 years', the event brought chaos to many parts of Northern England, Northern Wales, Northern Ireland and Scotland. The worst places affected were North West England, North East Wales and Northern Ireland. Also accompanying the snow were very strong winds and very cold weather. At least two deaths were reported.

== Meteorological history ==
The storm formed late on 15 March just off the coast of Newfoundland as a result of the Fujiwhara effect. It remained intertwined with another area of low pressure that sat over the far north of Canada until the 18th, when the low dissipated. The cyclone split into two, also on the 18th, with the cyclone to the north dissipating only hours after forming. The storm then underwent explosive cyclogenesis, falling from 1,000 millibars (30 inHg) at 18:00 on 18 March to 985 millibars (29.1 inHg) by 12:00 the next day. The storm then gathered momentum and moved into the central North Atlantic by 18:00 on the 20th, as well as rapidly increasing in size. The low continued to move westward on the 21st, being about 500 miles (800 km) off the south west coast of Ireland by 18:00. It also further increased in size, extending its influence from southern Portugal to just south of Greenland.

The weather fronts produced heavy rain over the far south west of the British Isles, but heavy snow to places further north over the 22nd and 23rd. However, it ultimately was weakened by the intense anticyclone block to the north. The storm weakened further on the 25th and was incorporated into a stronger area of low pressure, centred off the coast of Newfoundland.

== Impacts ==
Snowfall, strong winds and low temperatures were main features during the event.

=== Snowfall ===
Up to 4.0 ft (48 in) of snow was reported to have fallen in some places with up to 10 ft (120 in) drifts. 15 ft (180 in) drifts were reported in Lancashire. 1 ft (12 in) of snow fell even to low levels in parts of North East Wales.

=== Temperature ===
For many, the lowest daily maximum temperature of the month occurred on 24 March, just after the passing of the storm. At Cairngorm, the maximum temperature on 24 March was only −8.8 °C (16.2 °F). However, this was not the coldest day of the month.

=== Wind ===
Winds were very strong during the event; average wind speeds of up to 60 mph were recorded in the worst-hit areas of north-west England, south-west Scotland and Northern Ireland. This led to widespread disruption.
