= Larne =

Port town in County Antrim, Northern Ireland

Coordinates: 54°51′06″N 05°48′48″W

Larne: Irish: Latharna
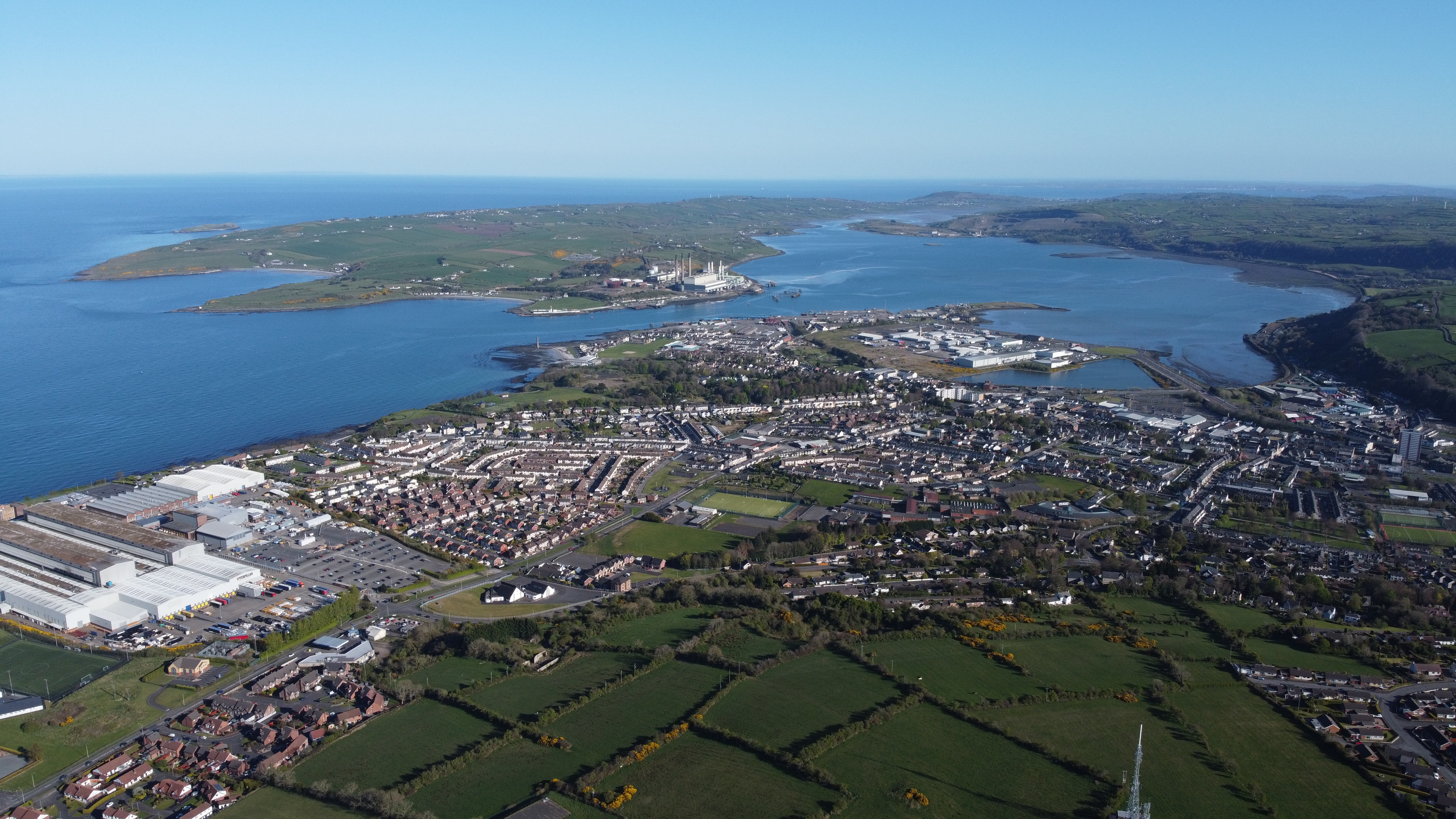
- 2020 view looking south-east towards Larne Harbour, Islandmagee, and down the length of Larne Lough

- Larne Coat of Arms

- Location within Northern Ireland
- Population: 18,853 (2021 census)
- Irish grid reference: D4102
  - Belfast: 30 km (19 mi)
- District: Mid and East Antrim
- County: County Antrim
- Country: Northern Ireland
- Sovereign state: United Kingdom
- Post town: LARNE
- Postcode district: BT40
- Dialling code: 028
- Police: Northern Ireland
- Fire: Northern Ireland
- Ambulance: Northern Ireland
- UK Parliament: East Antrim
- NI Assembly: East Antrim

Larne (from Irish Latharna, pronounced [ˈl̪ˠahəɾˠn̪ˠə], the name of a Gaelic territory) is a town on the east coast of County Antrim, Northern Ireland, with a population of 18,853 at the 2021 census. It is a major passenger and freight roll-on roll-off port. Larne is within the Mid and East Antrim Borough Council area. Together with parts of the neighbouring districts of Antrim and Newtownabbey and Causeway Coast and Glens, it forms the East Antrim constituency for elections to the Westminster Parliament and Northern Ireland Assembly. The civil parish is in the historic barony of Glenarm Upper.

== History ==
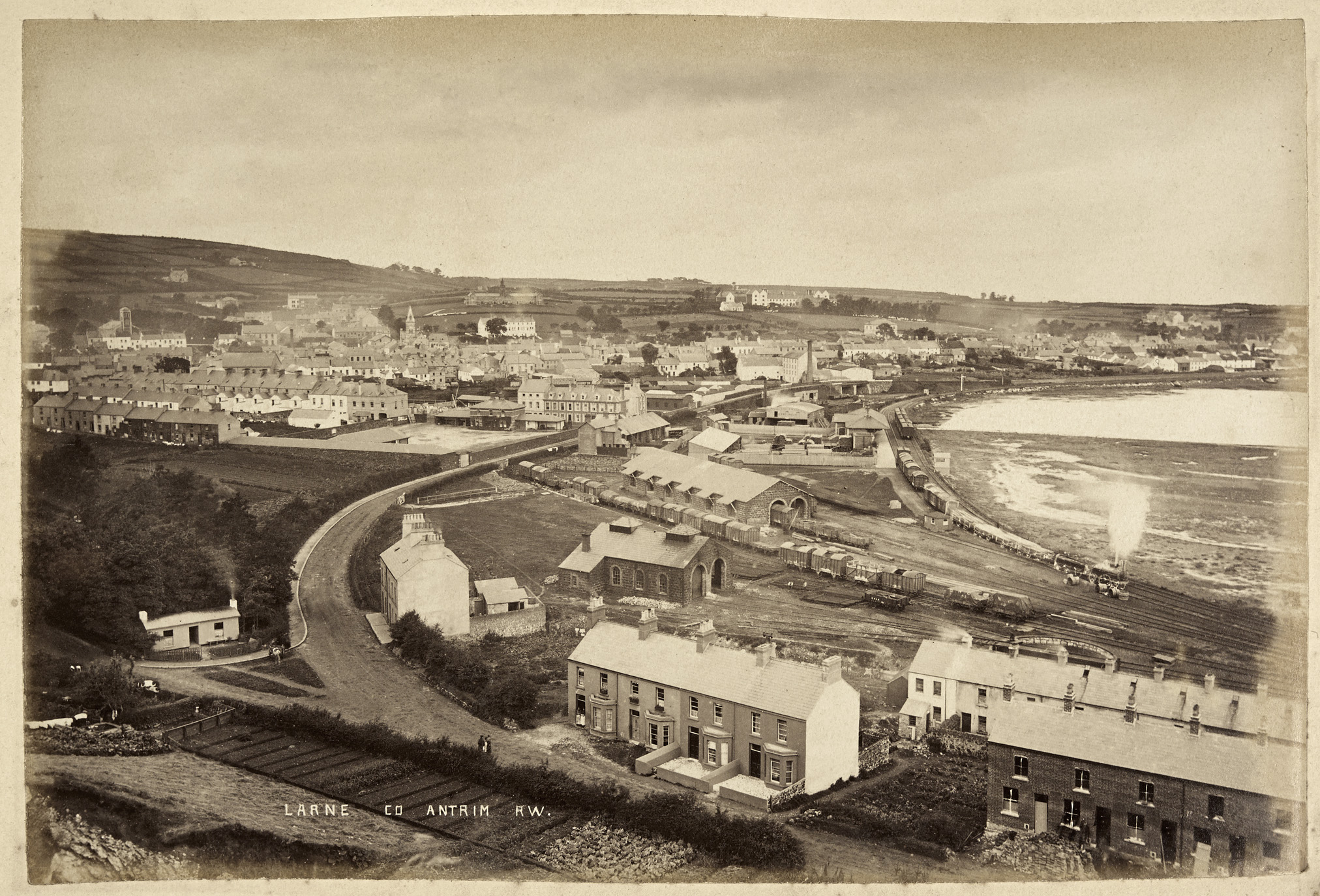
Larne c.1888

The coastal area around Larne has been inhabited for millennia and may be one of earliest inhabited areas of Ireland. Knockdhu, north of Larne, was the site of a Bronze Age promontory fort and settlement. Archaeological digs in the area have found flintwork and other artefacts which have been assigned dates from 6000 BCE onwards. The term Larnian has been coined by archaeologists to describe flintworks and similar artefacts of the Mesolithic era and to describe Mesolithic culture in Ireland as a whole. Larnian is also currently used to refer to people from Larne.

== Saints and scholars ==
From Magheramorne's Comgall (b. circa 516 AD), a prominent missionary of the early Celtic Church, to the hereditary Ó Gnímh bards in the Kilwaughter area in the late middle ages, Larne could be described historically as a land of saints and scholars.

Larne in the Early Middle Ages

Larne takes its name from Latharna, a Gaelic territory or túath that was part of the Ulaid petty kingdom of Dál nAraidi. The name spelt as Latharne was used at one point in reference to the Anglo-Norman cantred of Carrickfergus. Latharna itself means "descendants of Lathar." Lathar, according to legend, was the son of the pre-Christian king Úgaine Mór.

The town sprang up where the River Inver flows into Larne Lough. This area was known in Irish as Inbhear an Latharna ("rivermouth/estuary of Latharna") and was later anglicised as Inver Larne or simply Inver. Latharna was only applied exclusively to the town in recent centuries. In 204 CE, The Roman emperor Severus described a Roman galley bound for Scotland, which veered off course to a place called Portus Saxa. This is thought to be Larne Lough. There was Viking activity in Larne during the 10th and 11th centuries CE. Viking burial sites and artefacts have been found in the area and dated to that time. Ulfreksfjord was an Old Norse name for Larne Lough. According to the Norse historian Snorri Sturluson, Connor, King of Ireland, defeated Orkney Vikings at Ulfreksfjord in 1018. Later anglicised names include Wulfrichford, Wolderfirth, Wolverflete. The surviving name is Olderfleet, and the ending, fleet, comes from the Norse fljot, meaning "inlet". Older may come from the Norse oldu, meaning "wave". The town motto is Falce Marique Potens (Latin for "Powerful with the sickle and on the sea").

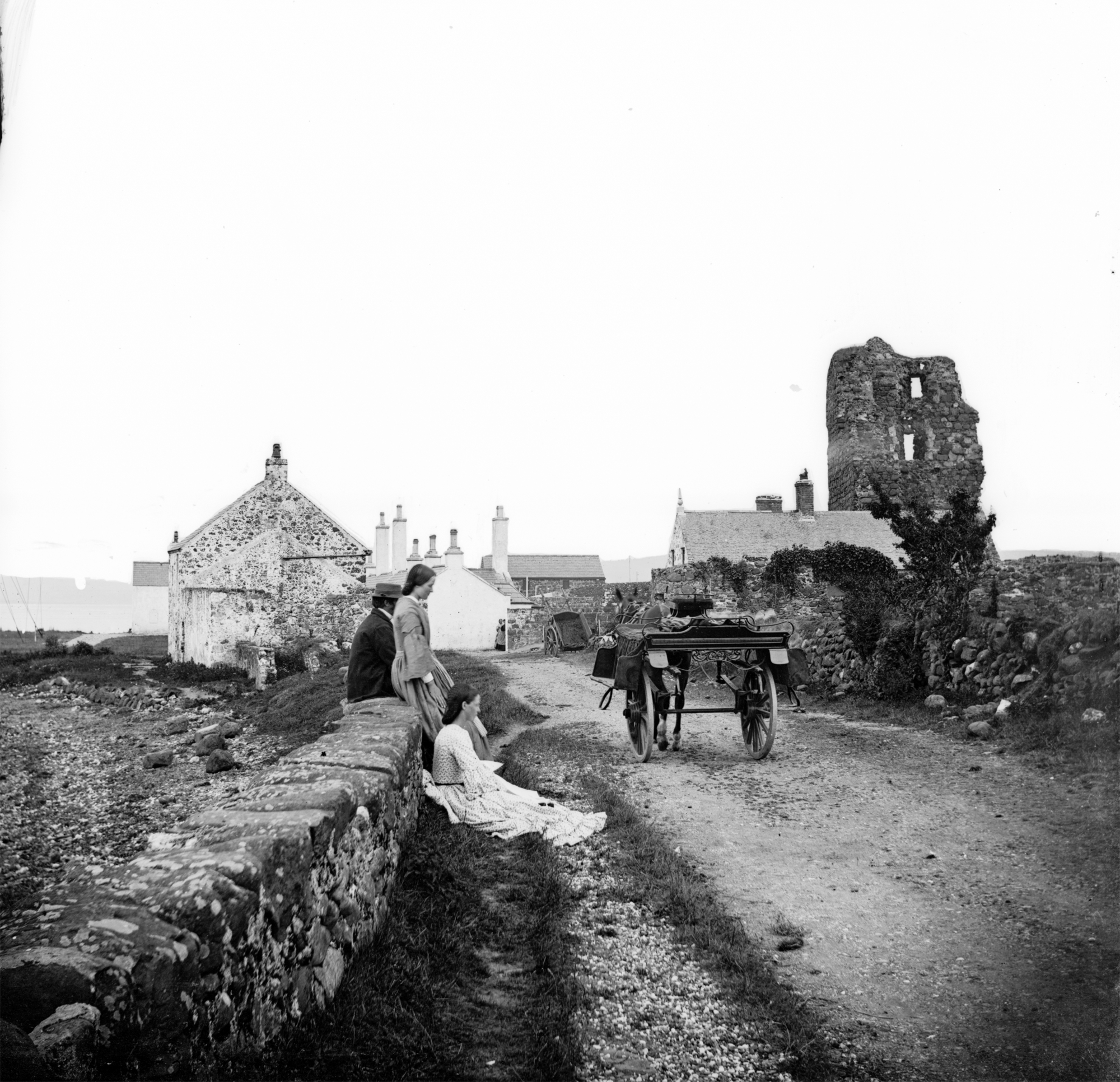
Ruins of Olderfleet Castle in the late 19th century

Larne in the High to Late Middle Ages

During the 12th and 13th centuries, Larne sat on a shifting frontier of Gaelic, Norse‑Gaelic and Anglo‑Norman influence. Following the temporary expulsion of Hugh de Lacy from Ulster in 1205, grants were made to members of the Galloway family, including Duncan FitzGilbert/ de Galloway (d. 1250), who was given Wulricheford(Ulrichfiord — Larne Lough), Iverthe (Inver in Larne parish) and Glinarne (Glenarm). In 1224 Duncan 'of Carrick' complained that Hugh de Lacy had seized the land of ‘Balgeithelauche’ — likely Ballygally.

In the parish of Kilwaughter, a fort held by the Anglo-Norman Adam Bisset was burned in 1282. The Bissets were associates of De Lacy and intermarried with the Fitzgilbert (Galloway) family. The Bisset clan was still ruling the Glynns area until at least 1522. The old tower at Ballygally Head was probably under Bisset control.

In 1272 Henry de Mandeville was a tenant of Adam Bisset in Craiganboy on the south side of the Glynn. De Mandeville went on to claim the townland as his own. There was subsequently a dispute over land at Kilwaughter between the de Mandevilles and Fitzwarins.

In 1245, the townland of Greenland was associated with the Pe de Lu family. The Earl of Ulster also leased Drumalis to Nicholas Pedelowe in 1333: the land comprised three carcucates, a mill and a court. A mill at Kilwaughter was also owned by the Earl of Ulster.

Ecclesiastical parishes were set up in Larne after 1210. Killyglen parish was in existence in the mid-13th century, its rectory granted to Muckamore Abbey by Isaac, bishop of Connor between 1245 and 1256. The parish of Ballyhampton was listed in 1306–07. There may have been some strategic reason why Ballyhampton fell under the bishop's land, as it was unusually small for a parish. Neighbouring Killyglen, Larne and Carncastle were secular estates.

John Bissett junior at the time of his death in 1259 held part of the land in Carncastle: Dronach (Droagh), Villa trium fontium (Ballyytober), Milltown, Villa Hacket (Ballyhacket), Carlcastel (Carncastle) and Carkemechan (Corkermain). Hugh de Lacy had kept the southern part of Duncan of Galloway's land to himself after he disseized him around 1227.

In 1333, the lands of the earl of Ulster 'within the county of Carrickfergus' included Dunmalys / Drumalis, the main settlement.

Killyglen may have been set up as a manor and parish in the same period.

In 1315, Edward the Bruce of Scotland, brother of Robert the Bruce, King of Scotland, landed at Larne with his 6000 strong army — Olderfleet Castle was of strategic importance. Edward saw Ireland as another front in the ongoing war against Norman England.

The name Bissett was associated with Larne until at least 1532. Gerald Missett (Bisset) was the last provost at Inver Monastry, which housed friars of the 3rd Order of St. Francis. King Henry VIII seized Inver house in 1532, and according to an inquisition document from 1605, the remaining friars died at Olderfleet on 1 Nov 1602. The crown also seized church lands at Ballyshagg (Ballysnod), Barnudod (Browndod), Garrimore (Gardenmore) & Ballygrenlawy (Greenland). Ballyhampton, near Kilwaughter, was an independent parish in this period. Likewise, there were ecclesiastical centres at Glynn and Killyglen. The parishes of Inverbeg and Invermore combined in the 1600s —Inverbeg parish covered Antiville, Ballyboley and Ballycraigy.

Bisset influence in Larne continued through the Antrim MacDonnells, descendents of Margery Bissett, who married Eoín MacDonnell in 1399.

Larne in the 1600s

In 1569, Elizabeth I, Queen of England and Ireland, appointed Sir Moyses Hill as the governor of Olderfleet Castle. It was seen as strategically important for any Tudor conquest of Ulster. The area around County Antrim was not part of the official seventeenth century Plantation. Many Scottish settlers arrived in the area through private settlement.

In the 1600s, much of the land around Larne was owned by various Agnew families, including landowners, hereditary poets and hereditary sheriffs, who had received land from Randal MacDonnell. Larne was a melting pot of language at that time, with Irish, Scots and English co-existing. From the late 1500s until around 1700, the Ó Gnímh poets (often Anglicised Agnew, Ogneeve, Ognive and Ogneiff) were patronised by the MacDonnell and O’Neill dynasties. Their prominence is attested by land grants in Kilwaughter parish, including the townlands of Lisnadrumbard, Mullachboy (Rory's Glen) and Tobbermore (Rory's Glen), which were granted to members of the bardic line in the 1620s by Randal MacDonnell. The written work of the Agnew bards of Kilwaughter is still important to scholars of Irish. The original manuscripts are held in Trinity College, Dublin.

Around 1613, the Agnews of Lochnaw, near Stranraer, were also given land in Larne, Inver and Kilwaughter by Randal MacDonnell. The Lochnaw Agnews held the sheriffship of Wigtownshire and the office of constable, their office continuing until its abolition in 1747. A collection of townlands in Kilwaughter and Millbrook is still known as Sheriff's Land today.

Several authors have explored the idea that the bards and sheriffs were connected through MacDonnell clan kinship, but the research is inconclusive. One of the Agnew families owned Kilwaughter Castle and became major landowners in County Antrim. The castle was originally built around 1622 as a fortified house. It sits in ruins today.

Eighteenth-Century Larne

During the eighteenth-century many Scotch-Irish people emigrated to America from the port of Larne. A monument in the Curran Park commemorates the Friends Goodwill, the first emigrant ship to sail from Larne in May 1717, heading for Boston, Massachusetts in the New England.

Larne was also the first town in county Antrim to be taken by United Irishmen during the rebellion of 1798. The Protestant rebels from this area (almost entirely Presbyterian) filled Larne and engaged the government forces around 2am on the morning of 7 June. This surprise attack drove the garrison to flee the town, at which point the rebel force marched off to join up with McCracken and fight in the Battle of Antrm. The events were recorded by Larne author James McHenry.

Nineteenth-Century Larne

In the 1860s and 1870s, Antrim industrialist James Chaine purchased the harbour, rebuilt piers and quays and established the short sea crossing to Scotland, thereby transforming the port’s fortunes. The regular steamboat service between Larne and Stranraer commenced on 1 July 1872.

The town diversified into leisure-driven tourism under tourism pioneer and hotelier Henry McNeill, who promoted Larne’s coastal scenery and hotel accommodation to visitors from Belfast and beyond. The combined growth of ship-yards, harbour infrastructure and visitor industry laid the foundations for Larne’s emergence as a key industrial-maritime and holiday hub in the early twentieth-century.

Twentieth-Century Larne

Larne had mixed fortunes in the twentieth-century. Global events, such as the First World War and subsequent economic depression of the 1930s, were hard on working class people, but after the Second World War, Larne witnessed significant development, with road widening, the addition of a flyover carriageway to the harbour, the clearance of 'slum dwellings', and the creation of large housing estates, such as Antiville and Craigyhill. There were ups and downs within industry, the G.E.C. on the Old Glenarm Road closing and then re-emerging as F.G. Wilsons (subsequently Caterpillar). Textiles declined and pharmaceuticals emerged.

The addition of a larger power station at Ballylumford increased the industrial appearance of the town, as did the addition of three high-rise flats in the Riverdale area in the 1960s, but the Antrim Coast Road and eighty per cent of the wider countryside remain areas of outstanding natural beauty. Larne's role as a tourism hub, however, diminished in the face of such transformation. There were also changes as people looked abroad. A blow to tourism came with the IRA bombing of the King's Arms Hotel in 1980.

Twenty-first-Century Larne

Renewed confidence after the 1998 Good Friday Agreement gave the town a boost. While Larne's population has been fairly static, new housing developments have grown in scale, taking more of the old countryside townlands, like Ballyhampton. The vistas of countryside and sea and wide participation in sport, community groups and the arts mean that Larne remains a thriving town. The neglected sites associated with the McNeill Hotel and Laharna Hotel have been redeveloped and many independent shops are still thriving, but poor planning laws have had dire consequences in the historic Point Street/ Dunluce Street area. Improvements have been made, however, with the addition of larger shopping precincts at the heart of residential areas. Larne Football Club also benefitted from an investment by Purple Bricks. There are continual calls for regeneration.

== Drumalis ==
One of the Larne towns assets is the Town Parks area, right at the heart of the town. In the midst of this public park is Drumalis, a private estate. Unlike other historic houses in the area, it has been protected from destruction. Drumalis was purchased by the Sisters of Cross and Passion in 1930, who have taken care of the estate since that time. As a convent, Drumalis catered for the Catholic women of the diocese, but today it is open to men and women of all faiths. A modern conference and residential facility was added in 2007-2008.

The land of Drumalis was once associated with the Anglo-Norman Pedelowe family. The hill of Drumalis was occupied by a Premonstratensian Friary in the middle ages. The current house on the site was built by Sir Hugh Smiley in 1872 and sold by Lady Elizabeth Smiley in 1927. B+ listed, it is exemplary of Victorian landscaping and architecture. The house features inlaid woodwork and stained glass designed by George Henry Walton. The gardens offer views over the harbour.

Drumalis was implicated in the Home Rule crisis in 1914, when opponents prepared for armed resistance. In an episode known as the Larne Gun Running German, Austrian and Italian weapons and ammunition were transported into the ports of Larne and Bangor during the night and distributed throughout Ulster. This event marked a major step in cementing the right to Ulster Unionist self-determination, ultimately leading to the creation of Northern Ireland.

== Irish dancing ==
Irish dancing occupies an important place in the Larne's cultural heritage. Larne added Irish folk dancing to its musical festival syllabus in 1928, laying the foundations of a cross-community activity which was embraced by Catholic and Protestant families alike, even during some of the most violent years of 'The Troubles.' One of the pioneers of Irish dancing in the town was Marjorie Gardiner (née Andrews), who ran the Andrews School of Irish Dancing at the Town Hall and became a founding member of the Festival Dance Teacher's Association. A pupil of Peadar O’Rafferty and Stella Mulholland in the early 1930s, she went on to set up her own school in 1936 and taught for more than sixty years, establishing a long lineage through teachers like Moira Metson, Nancy Hooper, Margaret McAllister and Bridie Kemp. By the 1970s, the Larne festival, hosted in the McNeill Hall, welcomed 2,400 dancers, making it one of the most important Irish dancing events in Northern Ireland. Through the efforts of today's dancing teachers, the festival tradition in Larne has been preserved. In 2018 the festival celebrated 90 years of Irish dancing in the town. By the 2010s, several schools had departed from the festival tradition and embraced the feis tradition.

== The Troubles ==
While much of the population of Larne lived in non-segregated housing developments and mixed socially, Larne, a predominantly Unionist town, was not untouched by the conflict. There was a paramilitary presence during The Troubles, mostly through the Ulster Volunteer Force (UVF) and Ulster Defence Association (UDA). The town suffered a number of Provisional Irish Republican Army (IRA) bomb attacks, notably a large car bomb at the King's Arms hotel in 1980 that caused damage to the main shopping area. This incident was raised in Parliament at the time.

Incidents that involved fatalities

- 16 September 1972: Sinclair Johnston, a UVF member, was shot by the Royal Ulster Constabulary during street disturbances in the town when the Royal Ulster Constabulary were protecting Catholics living in St Johns Place.
- 20 November 1974: Kevin Regan died from his injuries received in a UVF attack five days before on Maguires bar on Lower Cross Street. The Larne UDA blamed the IRA for the attack.
- 6 February 1975: Colette Brown, a Catholic, was found by the side of the Killyglen Road after being shot by Loyalists. Two men, one a UVF member the other a Lance Corporal in the UDR (Ulster Defence Regiment) were later convicted of her murder.
- 8 September 1975: Michael O'Toole, a Catholic, died from his injuries sustained in a loyalist booby trap bomb attached to his car two days previously.
- 24 August 1980: Rodney McCormick a Catholic, was shot dead by the Ulster Defence Association (UDA) in the Antiville area of the town. The gunmen involved were convicted.
- 11 July 2000: Andrew Cairns a UVF member, was killed by members of the UDA at an eleventh night bonfire celebration in a suspected loyalist feud at Ferris Park (an area known as Boyne Square). He may also have been murdered due to his alleged involvement in an earlier assault. The Royal Ulster Constabulary detective inspector, George Montgomery, did not find any motive for the murder. David Ervine (PUP) stated that there was no Loyalist feud.

== Geography ==
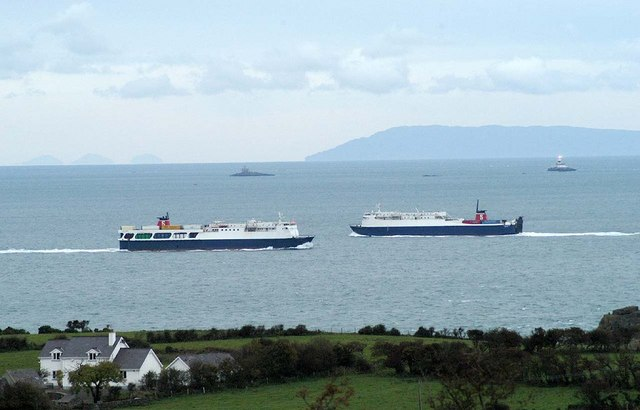
Photograph looking north from Islandmagee illustrating the proximity to Scotland. In the foreground is Islandmagee in Northern Ireland, followed by Stena Line ferries entering and leaving Larne, and The Maidens lighthouses. In the background are the Scottish Paps of Jura on the left and Mull of Kintyre on the right.

Larne sits within the traditional Glens of Antrim (in an area known historically as the Lower Glynns ). The town occupies the western side of a narrow inlet that links Larne Lough to the sea. On the eastern side of the inlet is a peninsula called Islandmagee. To the west of Larne is the ancient volcanic formation, the Antrim Plateau, which is composed of glaciated valleys or glens. Larne is 25 miles from the Scottish mainland, with views across the North Channel towards the Mull of Kintyre, Rhins of Galloway, Islay and Paps of Jura. This proximity to Scotland has had a defining influence on Larne's history and culture.

The town is within the small parish of the same name. Like the rest of Ireland, this parish is divided into townlands. The following is a list of townlands within Larne's urban area, along with their likely etymologies:

- Antiville: one theory in the is that this name comes from An Tigh Bhile meaning the house of the old tree, but other townlands had ville/villa as a direct Norman translation of Bally, e.g. Ballyhacket was Ville Hacket. Ante ville may signify 'in front of the settlement.'
- Ballyboley (from Baile Buaile meaning 'townland of the booley/dairy place')
- Ballycraigy (from Baile Creige meaning 'townland of the rocky outcrop')
- Ballyloran (from Baile Loairn meaning 'Loarn's townland')
- Blackcave North
- Blackcave South
- Curran and Drumalis (from Córran meaning 'crescent' and Druim a' Lios meaning 'ridge of the ringfort')
- Greenland (probably a Scandinavian name)
- Inver (from Inbhear meaning 'rivermouth')

Many street names in Larne end in brae, such as 'Whitla's Brae' which comes from the Scots for 'hillside'.

=== Civil parish of Larne ===
The civil parish contains the following townlands: Antiville, Ballyboley, Ballycraigy, Ballyloran, Blackcave North, Blackcave South, Curran and Drumaliss, Glebe, Greenland and Town Parks.

=== Gallery ===
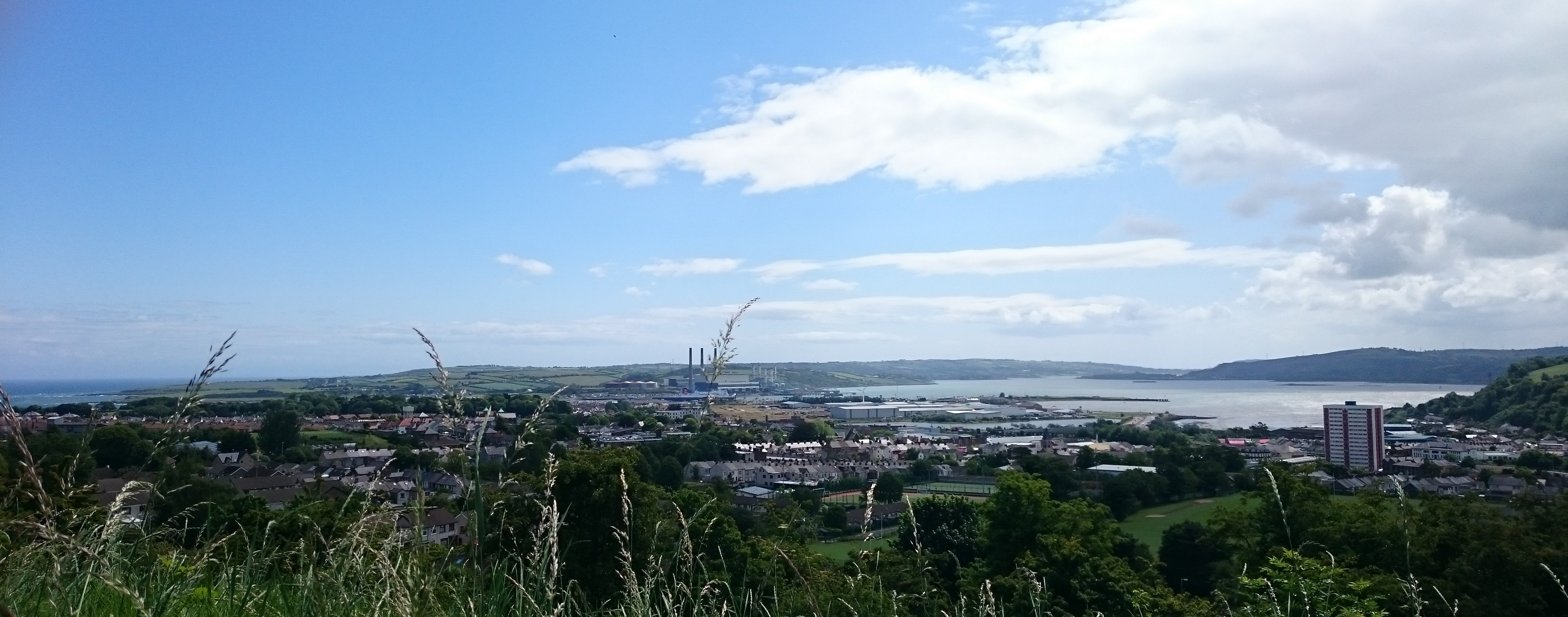
North Channel, Larne town, Islandmagee and Larne Lough from The Roddens.
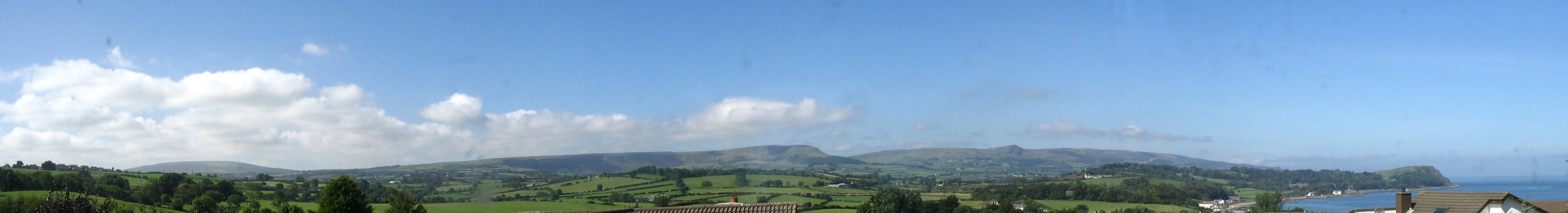
Panorama of the Antrim Plateau and Antrim Coast from the Blackcave area of Larne.
From left to right (panning from West to North): Craigy Hill, Agnew's Hill, Sallagh Braes, Knock Dhu, Scawt Hill, Drains Bay, Ballygally Head, North Channel

== Places of interest ==
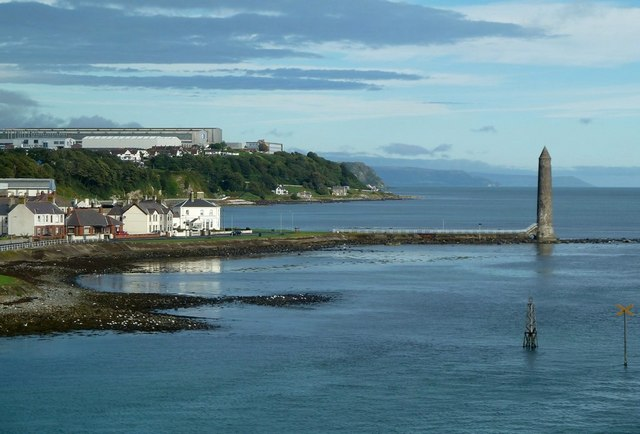
Looking towards Chaine Memorial Tower and north along the Antrim Coast towards the Glens of Antrim

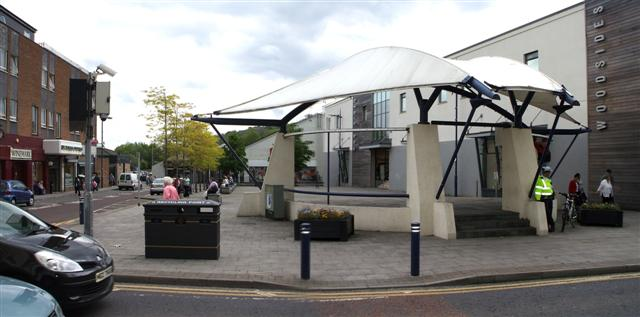
The bandstand on Larne Main Street. Removed in 2016 during upgrade work to the town centre pavements.

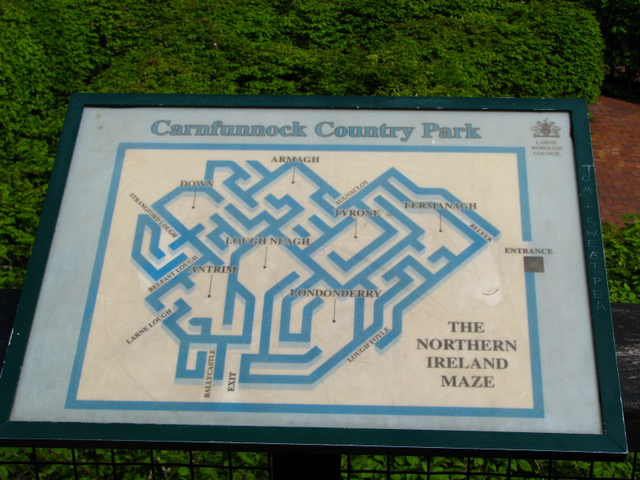
Maze in the shape of Northern Ireland in Carnfunnock Country Park

Larne's three most famous landmarks are the Chaine Memorial Tower, the Maiden islands and the Black Arch on the Antrim Coast Road. The town also has several parks, including Town Park, Chaine Park, Curran Park, and Smiley Park. Other leisure facilities include Larne Leisure Centre and Larne Museum & Arts Centre. Cairndhu Golf Course is situated atop of Ballygally Head and Larne Golf Course is in Islandmagee.

Significant buildings and structures include the Carnegie Arts Centre, situated on Victoria Road; St. Cedma's Church at Inver, which dates back to at least the 1300s; the ruins of Kilwaughter Castle, which was built around 1622; the Shaw's tower house at Ballygally Castle Hotel; and Olderfleet Castle. The town also has several good examples of Victorian and Edwardian villas, situated on the Glenarm Road, the upper Roddens and the Upper and Lower Cairncastle Road. Church buildings of note include the Larne & Kilwaughter Church on the Lower Cairncastle Road; the Presbyterian Church on the Victoria Road and the St. Macnissis Catholic Church on Agnew Street. Modern ecclesiastical buildings of architectural interest are the Mission Hall on the Old Glenarm Road and St. Antony's Catholic Church on the Upper Cairncastle Road.

Magheramorne, 5 miles to the south along Larne Lough, has a film studio which was used to film much of HBO TV Series Game of Thrones.

== Demography ==
=== 2021 Census ===
On census day (21 March 2021) there were 18,853 people living in Larne. Of these:

- 17.77% were aged under 16, 63.10% were aged between 16-65, and 19.13% were aged 66 and over.
- 51.27% of the usually resident population were female and 48.73% were male.
- 62.4% belong to or were brought up Protestant (including other Christian-related denominations), 23.9% belong to or were brought up Catholic, 0.9% belong to or were brought up in an 'other' religion, and 12.8% did not adhere to or weren't brought up in any religion.
- 66.6% indicated that they had a British national identity, 38.3% had a Northern Irish national identity, 10.3% had an Irish national identity, and 4.2% indicated they had an 'other' national identity. (respondents could indicate more than one national identity).
- 17.51% had some knowledge of Ulster Scots and 3.84% had some knowledge of Irish (Gaeilge).

=== 2011 Census ===
On census day (27 March 2011) there were 18,755 people living in Larne, accounting for 1.04% of the NI total. Of these:

- 18.59% were aged under 16 years and 18.00% were aged 65 and over.
- 51.98% of the usually resident population were female and 48.02% were male.
- 67.03% belong to or were brought up Protestant and other non-Catholic Christian (including Christian related) and 25.97% belong to or were brought up Catholic.
- 71.62% indicated that they had a British national identity, 30.56% had a Northern Irish national identity and 8.75% had an Irish national identity (respondents could indicate more than one national identity).
- 41 years was the average (median) age of the population.
- 17.20% had some knowledge of Ulster-Scots and 4.02% had some knowledge of Irish (Gaeilge).

== Industry and commerce ==
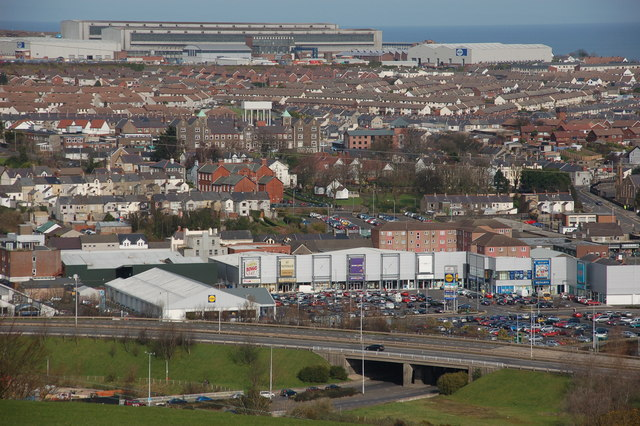
Larne in March 2007, with the FG Wilson plant dominating the top of the picture, Moyle Hospital in the centre, and the Laharna Retail Park (site of the former Invercon paper mill) at the bottom.

Ballylumford power station is Northern Ireland's main power station. Other energy operators in Larne include B9 Energy (a renewable energy development company).

Larne is also home to the headquarters of Caterpillar (NI) Limited (part of the Caterpillar group which manufactures diesel and gas generators); InspecVision (industrial inspection equipment); TerumoBCT (a Japanese manufacturer of intravenous drip solutions and blood products); and the LEDCOM (Larne Enterprise Development Company) business park.

Shops are located mainly on Larne Main Street and Laharna Retail Park, with other retail outlets situated in the Redlands industrial Estate. A market is also held every Wednesday at the Larne Market Yard.

== Transport ==
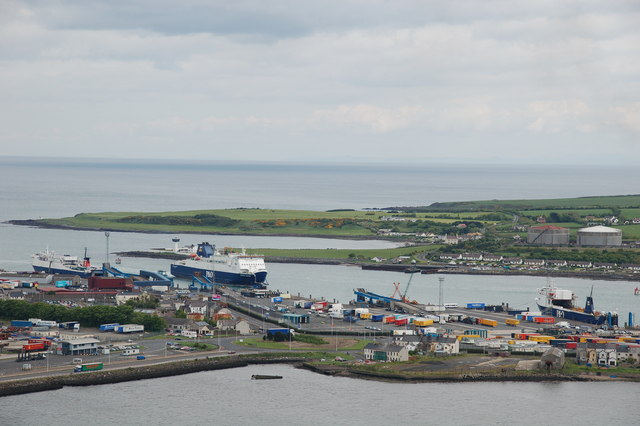
Larne Harbour from the hill at Inver

=== Ferry ===
Ferries sail from the harbour to Cairnryan in Scotland. Passenger services are operated by P&O Irish Sea. In 2026 the Isle of Man Steam Packet Company commenced services to Douglas, Isle of Man.

=== Road ===
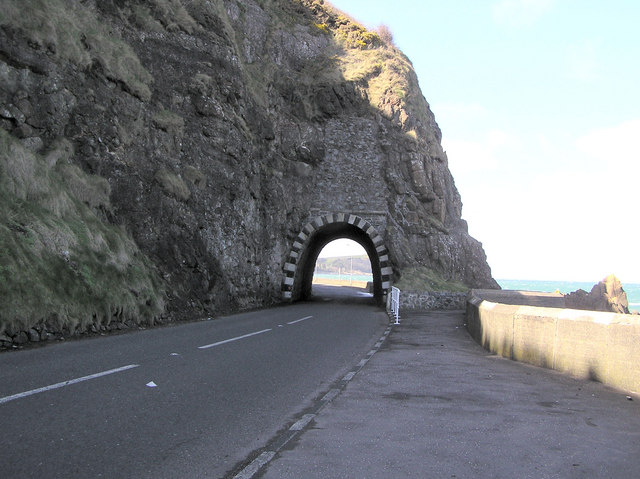
The Blackcave Tunnel or "Black Arch" at the start of the scenic Antrim Coast Road at the northern edge of Larne.

Larne is connected to Belfast by the A8 road. The A2 road or 'Antrim coast road' which runs along the Antrim coast, and passes through the scenic Glens of Antrim, also serves the town. South of the town the A2 passes the side of Larne Lough, via Glynn, Magheramorne, and Ballycarry, to Whitehead and Carrickfergus. The A36 road runs from the town to Ballymena.

=== Rail ===
The Belfast–Larne railway line connects to Belfast Grand Central and Belfast Lanyon Place, via Whitehead, Carrickfergus and Jordanstown. Currently there is no freight transport by rail in Northern Ireland. Both Larne Town railway station and Larne Harbour railway station opened on 1 October 1862 and closed for goods traffic on 4 January 1965.

The Ballymena and Larne Railway was a narrow-gauge railway. It opened in 1878, was closed to passengers in 1933 and finally completely closed in 1950. Another line ran from Larne to Ballyclare and some parts of it can still be made out where it ran along the Six Mile valley.

== Public services ==
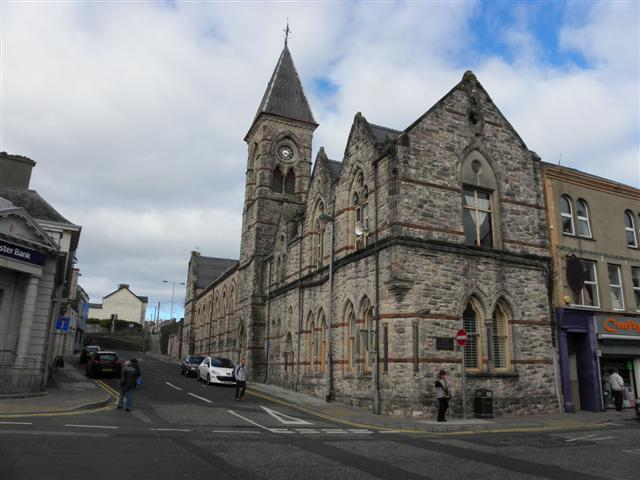
Larne Town Hall

Larne Town Hall, dating from 1870 was once a busy community hub for local organisations such as Irish dancing and bands, but it mainly serves as an events centre for Mid & East Antrim Council today. Antrim Area Hospital, 40 minutes from Larne by car, serves as the town's hospital — Moyle Hospital in Larne offers outpatients services only. Larne courthouse was closed in 2013 and still sits empty. In 2024, Mid and East Antrim Council, sold the Smiley Buildings, which were bequeathed to the people of the town, and functioned as the town's council buildings until that time. In 2025, the council also sold off extensive public land that had been bequeathed to the people of the town, including rural sites at Old Glenarm Road, Brustin Brae Road/Ballytober Road, and Brustin Brae Road/Old Glenarm Road.

== Education ==
Secondary schools located in Larne are Larne Grammar School and Larne High School. Northern Regional College (formerly Larne Technical College) closed down in 2010 and was replaced by AEL (Access Employment Limited), a training and employment provider for people with disadvantages. Other schools are Roddensvale School, Moyle Primary School, St. MacNissis' Primary School, St. Anthony's Primary School, Linn Primary School, Corran Integrated School, Olderfleet Primary School and Larne & Inver Primary School.

== Notable people ==
- Dianne Barr, paralympic swimmer
- Billy Brown, musician
- James Chaine, Member of Parliament
- Dave Clements, footballer and football manager
- Fyfe Ewing, musician, drummer (ex-Therapy?)
- Robert Ferguson, disc jockey
- Keith Gillespie, Sheffield United and Northern Ireland midfielder.
- Robert John Gregg, pioneer of the academic study of Ulster-Scots dialects as well as a linguistic authority on Canadian English
- Mark Haggan, activist
- Angeline King, writer
- Richard Hayward, actor/singer, author
- Valerie Hobson, actress
- Jeff Hughes, footballer
- Michael Hughes, Wimbledon and Coventry City footballer
- Whitford Kane, actor
- Valerie Lilley, actor (Shameless)
- Sir Ivan Magill, innovating anaesthetist; went to Larne Grammar school
- Dave McAuley, former IBF Flyweight world champion boxer
- Gareth McAuley, current West Bromwich Albion defender
- Colin McGarry, Professional Darts Corporation player
- Adam McGurk, footballer
- James McIlroy, Olympic runner
- Bobby McKee, Democratic Unionist Party councillor; former Mayor of Larne
- Jack McKee, alderman and veteran loyalist politician
- Michael McKeegan, musician (Therapy?)
- Amanda McKittrick Ros, author, poet; taught at Millbrook National School during the 1880s
- Eddie McMorran, footballer
- Arthur Meek, army officer
- Eddie Mooney, musician (The Dakotas, The Fortunes)
- Hugh Nelson, Lieutenant Governor of British Columbia (1830–1893)
- Robert Nelson, electronic music producer (Agnelli & Nelson)
- Jonathan Rea, Superbike World Championship rider
- Maxwell Reed, actor
- Keith Semple, (One True Voice from the ITV series Popstars: The Rivals)
- Smiley baronets, series of baronets of Drumalis, Larne
- Jonny Steele, Wolverhampton Wanderers F.C., New York Red Bulls and Northern Ireland footballer
- Norman Surplus, first person to complete a circumnavigation of Earth by Autogyro
- Harry Towb, actor

== Freedom of the borough ==
In memory of a battle in the town of Musa Qala in Afghanistan in 2006, involving the Royal Irish Regiment, a new regimental march, composed by Chris Attrill and commissioned by Larne Borough Council, was gifted to the regiment on Saturday 1 November 2008 in Larne, during an event in which the regiment was presented with "the Freedom of the Borough".

This gave the regiment the right to march through the towns of the borough with 'flags flying, bands playing and bayonets fixed'. The march was named Musa Qala.

== Events ==
The Friends Goodwill Music Festival occurs in May each year and supports local music.

== Sport ==
=== Association Football ===
Larne F.C., a professional association football club, plays in the NIFL Premiership. Local amateur football clubs include Larne Technical Old Boys F.C. and Wellington Recreation F.C.

=== Rugby Union ===
Larne RFC is an amateur rugby union club, formerly based at Sandy Bay in the town, but relocated to the nearby village of Glynn in 1968.

=== Gaelic Games ===
Latharna Óg GAC is a hurling club, located at Brustin Brae, just outside the town, and won the 2019 Antrim Junior B Hurling Championship.

== Twin city ==
Larne is twinned with Clover, South Carolina, which has named one of its schools, Larne Elementary School, after Larne.

== Notable facts ==
- Larnite – this mineral is named after Larne.

== See also ==
- List of civil parishes of County Antrim
- List of localities in Northern Ireland by population
- List of RNLI stations
