= Robert John Gregg =

Irish-Canadian linguist (1912–1998)

Robert John Gregg (July 2, 1912, in Larne, County Antrim, Ireland – November 15, 1998, in Vancouver, BC, Canada), known as Bob Gregg or R. J. Gregg, was a linguist, a pioneer of the academic study of Ulster-Scots as well as a linguistic authority on Canadian English.

== Personal and early childhood ==
Robert John Gregg, the second child and eldest son of Thomas Gregg and Margaret McDowell, was born July 2, 1912, in a house on Glenarm Road in Larne, County Antrim, Ireland. In 1905, his grandfather George Gregg, and his family, arrived in Larne from the Clough area of Co Antrim. George Gregg & Sons operated a road contracting business, and many of the roads in and around Larne were built by the Gregg Company . The McDowell family came from the Glynn/Gleno area of Larne. From a young age, Gregg was interested in linguistics. He grew up around the “urban modified English” in Larne. However, he and his brother frequently holidayed at the countryside with his mother's relatives. In the more rural areas he discovered the Ulster-Scots language. He stated in his M.A. dissertation that his 'linguistic curiosity was early aroused by the sharp contrasts' between the two language varieties, and 'these bilingual comparisons have always been discussed with interest in my own family, and with the help in particular of my mother and my brother'. By his teenage years, he began collecting linguistic material. By 1930, he was already writing down his own notes regarding his research on linguistics. He later married his wife Millicent, known also as “Penny,” (née Bowman). With her, he had three sons and a daughter. They moved with him to Vancouver, BC, Canada in 1954.

== Education ==
Gregg began his education at Larne Grammar School. It was here where he, as a teenager, began to notice the striking differences between the urban modified English taught and practiced there with the speech of some of his classmates, which included a cousin, who were from the rural areas. After graduating from Larne Grammar School, he attended Queen's University, Belfast. He graduated from Queen's in 1933 with a B.A. (Honours) degree that mainly focused on French and German and to a limited degree on Spanish. He then studied in pre-war Nazi-Germany for just a year, where he experienced the effects of fascism, which were especially forceful in (German) language studies, first hand. Subsequently, his M.A. was also taken at Queen's University. His dissertation, presented May 1953, was on the historical phonology of the East Antrim Ulster-Scots. Between 1933 and the culmination of his Master's studies, he also studied Latin and Spanish. He passed his examinations in Intermediate Latin in 1948 and took a B.A. in Spanish, both at the University of London. From 1960 to 1963 he worked on his doctorate at the University of Edinburgh, where he studied “The Boundaries of the Scotch-Irish Dialects in Ulster.”

== Career ==
Gregg began his teaching career as a Senior Modern Languages Master at Regent House School, Newtownards, in 1934. He taught as Head of the Modern Languages Department and Senior Master at Belfast Mercantile College from 1939 to 1954. He Immigrated to Canada in 1954 and was appointed Assistant Professor of French at the University of British Columbia in January 1955. Later, he become a Professor in the Department of Linguistics in 1969, and subsequently became the head of that department from 1972 to 1980. After he retired from teaching, he set up the first language laboratory in Canada at the University of British Columbia.

For a time he was co-editor with John Braidwood of the Ulster Dialect Dictionary project. This project was put on hold and Gregg went on to other things. In 1989, the Department of Education in Northern Ireland commissioned the Concise Ulster Dictionary and Gregg was enlisted as a consultant and editor through 1994. This Dictionary made its appearance in 1996.

Gregg was a member of the Canadian Linguistic Association. In 1957 the Association established a Lexicographical committee, whose goal was the creation of three dictionaries. Out of this committee came a series of four dictionaries, entitled collectively as the Gage Dictionary of Canadian English, of which he was a co-editor. This dictionary was a compilation of three smaller dictionaries - The Intermediate Dictionary (1963), The Beginning Dictionary (1962), and The Senior Dictionary(1967) – and “A Dictionary of Canadianism on Historical Principles". Gregg was responsible for The Senior Dictionary, which by the 1979 edition had been renamed "Gage Canadian Dictionary" and became the leading dictionary for Canadian English for the 1980s and 1990s. This dictionary was first published in 1967 in Vancouver, BC, just in time for the Canadian Centennial.

Gregg helped preserve the Mount Currie (British Columbia) language and Sechelt language in written form in the 1960s after the last fluent elders had died.

== Main research areas and influence ==
=== Ulster Scots ===
Gregg was keen on researching the Ulster-Scots language and dedicated much of his research time on linguistic analysis and the application of his research. His work was quite extensive and widely published. See the Publications list for more information on his publications. While on sabbatical from UBC in 1960, Gregg travelled back to Ulster and participated in the conference inaugurating the Ulster Dialect Archive at the Ulster Folk Museum (now the Ulster Folk and Transport Museum) in 1960. From 1960 to 1963, he also finished his doctoral fieldwork. He travelled throughout the Ulster countryside and interviewed older traditional speakers. This fieldwork culminated in a widely revered map with precise detail on the geographical boundaries of the Ulster-Scots language. “He was the first to demonstrate that Ulster-Scots was spoken in the eastern part of County Donegal in the Republic of Ireland and was thus international.” This map is still used today, although some more recent work has shown that there are areas, such as south-west Tyrone, that have Ulster Scots characteristics even though they were not categorised as Ulster Scots by Gregg.

==== Ulster-Scots orthography ====
Also starting in the 1960s, Gregg began to devise an orthography for Ulster-Scots. This orthography was based on Gregg's extensive fieldwork in the province. “In this process he produced transcriptions of local Ulster-Scots texts, or in some cases Ulster-Scots versions of English texts, to test and demonstrate various conventions.” Near the end of his life he shared his work with the Ulster Folk and Transport Museum's Concise Ulster Dictionary project, which ran from 1989–96. He was also hopeful that the new Ulster-Scots Language Society and Ulster-Scots Academy (created in 1994) would find his work useful for the Academy's language development work.

=== Canadian English ===
In 1957, Gregg made a phonological assessment of Vancouver, BC, speech in 1957. In the late 1960s and early 1970s, Gregg conducted a survey of southern British Columbia English. The results were not published, but can be found in two M.A. theses.

==== Survey of Vancouver English, 1976-1984 ====
In 1976, Gregg and a team of students, featuring Margaret Murdoch, Gaelan Dodds de Wolf, and Erika Hasebe-Ludt, embarked on a major project surveying the English spoken by native English speakers born in Vancouver, BC, Canada. It began with a small preliminary survey from 1976 to 1978 of 60 individuals. This survey was then incorporated with the larger Survey of Vancouver English that ran from 1978 to 1984. The larger survey included the individuals from the preliminary survey as well as 240 other individuals. After its completion, it was a primary informant for de Wolf's study comparing English in Vancouver with that of English in Ottawa. The survey was funded by grants from the Social Sciences and Humanities Research Council and other foundations.

== Awards and recognition ==
Named Honorary President of the Ulster-Scots Language Society in his later years.

== Bibliography ==
Source: “The Academic Study of Ulster-Scots” edited by Anne Smyth, Michael Montgomery, and Philip Robinson.

=== Ulster-Scots ===
- 'The Ulster Dialect Dictionary: Belfast Field Club's New Project', Ulster Education (September 1951), 24–25.
- 'Dialect Detective: On the Trail of "a desperate coulrife crater'", Ireland's Saturday Night (13 June 1953).
- 'Notes on the Phonology of a Co. Antrim Scotch-Irish Dialect, Part I: Synchronic', Orbis 7 (1958), 392–406.
- Review of P. L. Henry's An Anglo-Irish Dialect of North Roscommon in Orbis 7 (1958), 582–584.
- 'Notes on the Phonology of a Co. Antrim Scotch-Irish Dialect, Part II: Diachronic', Orbis 8 (1959), 400–424.
- Review of P. L. Henry's 'A Linguistic Survey of Ireland: Preliminary Report' in Orbis 9 (1960), 566–567.
- 'The Boundaries of the Scotch-Irish Dialects in Ulster' (Ph.D. thesis, University of Edinburgh, 1963).
- 'Scotch-Irish Urban Speech in Ulster' in G. Brendan Adams (ed.), Ulster Dialects: an Introductory Symposium (Holywood: Ulster Folk Museum, 1964), 163–192.
- 'Linguistic Change Observed: Three Types of Phonological Change in the Scotch-Irish Dialects' in André Rigault and René Charbonneau (eds.), Proceedings of the Seventh International Congress of Phonetic Sciences. Held at the University of Montreal and McGill University 22–28 August 1971 (The Hague/Paris: Mouton, 1972), 722–724.
- 'The Scotch-Irish Dialect Boundaries in Ulster' in Martyn Wakelin (ed.), Patterns in the Folk Speech of the British Isles (London: Athlone, 1972), 109–139.
- 'The Distribution of Raised and Lowered Diphthongs as Reflexes of M.E. ī in Two Scotch-Irish Dialects' in W. U. Dressler and F. V. Mareš (eds.), Phonologica: Akten der 2 Internationalen Phonologie-Tagung 1972 (Vienna/Munich: Fink, 1975), 101–105.
- 'Dialect Mixture in Scotch-Irish Urban Speech', Northern Ireland Speech and Language Forum Journal 2 (1976), 35–37.
- 'The Feature "Dentality" as a Sociolinguistic Marker in Anglo-Irish Dialects' in 'Proceedings of the VIIIth International Congress of Phonetic Sciences' at Leeds, 1975 (unpublished).Canadian English
- The Scotch-Irish Dialect Boundaries in the Province of Ulster ([Port Credit, Ontario, Canadian Federation for the Humanities], 1985).
- Review article on Peter Trudgill (ed.), Language in the British Isles (Cambridge University Press, 1984) in Language and Society (1987), 245–251.
- (with Michael Montgomery) 'The Scots Language in Ulster' in Charles Jones (ed.), The Edinburgh History of the Scots Language (Edinburgh University Press, 1997), 569–622.

=== Canadian English ===
- 'Notes on the Pronunciation of Canadian English as Spoken in Vancouver, B.C.', Journal of the Canadian Linguistic Association 3 (March 1957), 20–26.
- 'Neutralisation and Fusion of Vocalic Phonemes in Canadian English as Spoken in the Vancouver Area', Journal of the Canadian Linguistic Association 3 (October 1957), 78–83.
- (ed., with W. S. Avis and M. H. Scargill) Dictionary of Canadian English: The Beginning Dictionary (Toronto: W. J. Gage Ltd., 1962).
- 'Canadian Lexicography' (review of J. P. Vinay et al., Le Dictionnaire Canadien [Université de Montréal: McClelland & Stewart]), Canadian Literature 14 (Autumn 1962), 68–71.
- (ed., with W. S. Avis and M. H. Scargill) Dictionary of Canadian English: The Intermediate Dictionary (Toronto: W. J. Gage Ltd., 1963).
- (ed., with W. S. Avis and M. H. Scargill) Dictionary of Canadian English: The Senior Dictionary (Toronto: W. J. Gage Ltd., 1967).
- 'The Phonology of Canadian English as Spoken in the Area of Vancouver, British Columbia' in Ronald H. Southerland (ed.), Readings on Language in Canada (Calgary: Dept. of Linguistics, University of Calgary, 1972), 34-54 [reprint of 'Notes on the Pronunciation of Canadian English as Spoken in Vancouver, B.C.', JCLA 3 (March 1957) (q.v.) and 'Neutralisation and Fusion of Vocalic Phonemes in Canadian English as Spoken in the Vancouver Area', JCLA 3 (October 1957) (q.v.)]. Further editions: 1973 and 1974.
- (ed., with W. S. Avis et al.), The Gage Canadian Dictionary (Toronto: Gage Educational Pub., 1973).
- 'The Phonology of Canadian English as Spoken in the Area of Vancouver, B.C.' in J. K. Chambers (ed.), Canadian English: Origins and *Structures (Toronto: Methuen, 1975), 133-144 [reprint of 'Notes on the Pronunciation of Canadian English as Spoken in Vancouver, B.C.', JCLA 3 (March 1957) (q.v.) and 'Neutralisation and Fusion of Vocalic Phonemes in Canadian English as Spoken in the Vancouver Area', JCLA 3 (October 1957) (q.v.)].
- (ed., with W. S. Avis et al.), Canadian Junior Dictionary (Agincourt, Ont.: Gage Educational Pub., 1976).
- (ed., with W. S. Avis et al.), Dictionary of Canadian English (Vol. 3) revised edition (Toronto: Gage Educational Pub., 1973).
- (with W. S. Avis and M. H. Scargill) The Canadian Intermediate Dictionary revised edition (Toronto: Gage Pub., 1979).
- 'An Urban Dialect Survey of the English Spoken in Vancouver, B.C.: General Background to the Survey of Vancouver English (SVEN)', H. J. Warkentyne (ed.), Papers from the Fourth International Conference on Methods in Dialectology (Victoria, B.C.: University of Victoria, 1981), 41–47.
- 'Canadian English' in Y. Matsumura (ed. and trans. into Japanese), Varieties of English, Commonwealth English Series (Himeji, Japan, 1981).
- 'Local Lexical Items in the Sociodialectical Survey of Vancouver English', Canadian Journal of Linguistics 28:1, 17–23.
- (with W. S. Avis and M. H. Scargill) The Gage Canadian Dictionary revised edition (Toronto: Gage Pub. Co., 1984).
- Final Report to the Social Sciences and Humanities Research Council of Canada on 'An Urban Dialect Survey of the English Spoken in Vancouver' (SVEN) (Vancouver: University of British Columbia, 1984).
- 'The Vancouver Survey: Grammatical Usage', H. J. Warkentyne (ed.), Papers from the Fifth International Conference on Methods in Dialectology (Victoria, B.C.: University of Victoria, 1985), 179–184.
- (with M. H. Scargill) The Gage Junior Dictionary revised edition (Toronto: Gage Educational Pub., 1985).
- 'The Standard and Where We Stand Now' in W. C. Lougheed (ed.), In Search of the Standard in Canadian English, Occasional Papers of the Strathy Language Unit, Queen's University, No. 1 (Kingston, Ont.: Strathy Language Unit, 1986), 157–168.
- 'The Study of Linguistic Change in the Survey of Vancouver English' in A. Thomas (ed.), Methods in Dialectology (Proceedings of the Sixth International Conference on Methods in Dialectology) (Clevedon, England: Multilingual Matters, 1987), 434–441.
- 'La lexicographie de l'anglais canadien', Revue québécoise de linguistique 18:1 (1989), 151–187.
- 'The Survival of Local Lexical Items as Specific Markers in Vancouver English' in R. Bosteels, L. Isebaert and P. Swiggers (eds.) Orbis 34 (1991), 231–241.
- 'The Survey of Vancouver English', American Speech 67:3 (1992), 250–267.
- 'Canadian English Lexicography' in Sandra Clarke (ed.), Focus on Canada (Amsterdam: Benjamins, 1993), 27-44 [published as G11 of the series Varieties of English Around the World.]
- 'The Survival of Local Lexical Items as Specific Markers in Vancouver English' in William A. Kretzschmar (ed.), Journal of English Linguistics: Essays in Memory of Harold B. Allen 23:1&2 (1990-1995), 184–194.

The Survey of Vancouver English: A Sociolinguistic Study of Urban Canadian English, by Robert J. Gregg. Ed. Gaelan Dodds de Wolf, Margery Fee and Janice McAlpine. Occ. Paper No. 5. Strathy Language Unit, Queen’s U, Kingston, ON, 2004.

=== Canadian and Scots-Irish ===
- 'The Diphthongs [əi] and [aı] in Scottish, Scotch-Irish and Canadian English', Canadian Journal of Linguistics 18 (1973), 136–145.
- 'Irish English' and 'Canadian English' in Collins Dictionary of the English Language (London: Collins, 1979), xxvi-xxvii.

=== Other languages ===
- Introduction to the Pronunciation of French, with Phonetic Texts (Vancouver: U.B.C., 1957).
- (with J. G. Andison) Second Year University French: A Correspondence Course (Vancouver: U.B.C., 1957).
- A Students' Manual of French Pronunciation (Toronto: The MacMillan Co. of Canada Ltd., 1960).
- Review of Jean C. Batt's 'French Pronunciation and Diction' in Journal of the Canadian Linguistic Association 6:1 (March 1960), 69–71.
- 'The Greeks had a Word for it' in M. H. Scargill and P. G. Penner (eds.), Looking at Language (Toronto: W. J. Gage Ltd., 1966), 40–53.
- 'The Indo-European Language Family' in M. H. Scargill (ed.), Introductory Essays in Linguistics (Victoria, 1967), 166–189.
- (with Evangeline Tan) 'The Phonology of Tausug', Le Maître Phonétique 132 (1969), 37–39. JSTOR 44705569
- (with Norma Olaya) 'The Phonology of Ilokano', Le Maître Phonétique 132 (1969), 39–41. JSTOR 44705569
- 'The Linguistic Survey of British Columbia: The Kootenay Region' in Regna Darnell (ed.), Canadian Languages in Their Social Context (Edmonton: Linguistic Research, 1973), 105–116.
