= Arthur Meek =

Indian political service officer (1883–1955)

Lieutenant-Colonel Arthur Stanley Meek CMG (7 October 1883 – 14 August 1955) was a British Indian Army and Indian Political Service officer.

Meek was born in Larne, Ireland, the son of a clergyman. He was educated at Bedford School and the Royal Military College, Sandhurst, and was commissioned a second lieutenant in the Indian Army on 21 January 1903. In 1907, he joined the Bombay Political Department. He served as Military Governor of Basra from 1917 to 1919, for which he was mentioned in dispatches, and undertook a special mission to Tehama in Yemen in 1919, for which he was appointed Companion of the Order of St Michael and St George (CMG) in January 1920. His final post was as Agent to the Governor-General in the Eastern States Agency from 1934 to 1937. He retired in 1938.
