= Mid-Antrim Museums Service =

The Mid-Antrim Museums Service is a local history museum service in County Antrim in Northern Ireland. It is composed of four local museums, Ballymena, Carrickfergus, Larne and Newtownabbey that are dedicated to presenting and preserving history and cultural heritage of mid-Antrim. The MAMS coordinates diverse media and programmes for its constituent museums, including museum and community-based exhibitions, temporary and travelling exhibitions, schools programmes, loan boxes and an EU-Peace-II-funded community history programme.
