= Latharna Óg GAC =

- Founded: 1965
- County: Antrim
- Colours: Yellow and Blue
- Grounds: Brustin Braes
- Coordinates: 54°52′40″N 5°51′31″W

Playing kits
Standard colours

The Latharna Óg Gaelic Athletic Club is a Gaelic Athletic Association club in County Antrim, Northern Ireland.

It was founded in 1965 and is affiliated to Antrim GAA. The club is based in the town of Larne, in the east of the county. As of 2024, the club was competing in hurling in the Antrim Junior B Hurling Championship and Division 4 of the Antrim All-County League. It also competes in the Antrim camogie leagues and championships.

== History ==
The club initially played its matches in 'Gerry's Field', which was owned by the Northern Ireland Housing Executive. The club then shared grounds with Shane O'Neills GAC Glenarm before purchasing its own ground in 1999. They developed facilities, including changing rooms, in the early 2000s. The official opening of these facilities in 2006 was attended by Ulster Council president Tom Daly and chairman John McSparran.

== Facilities ==
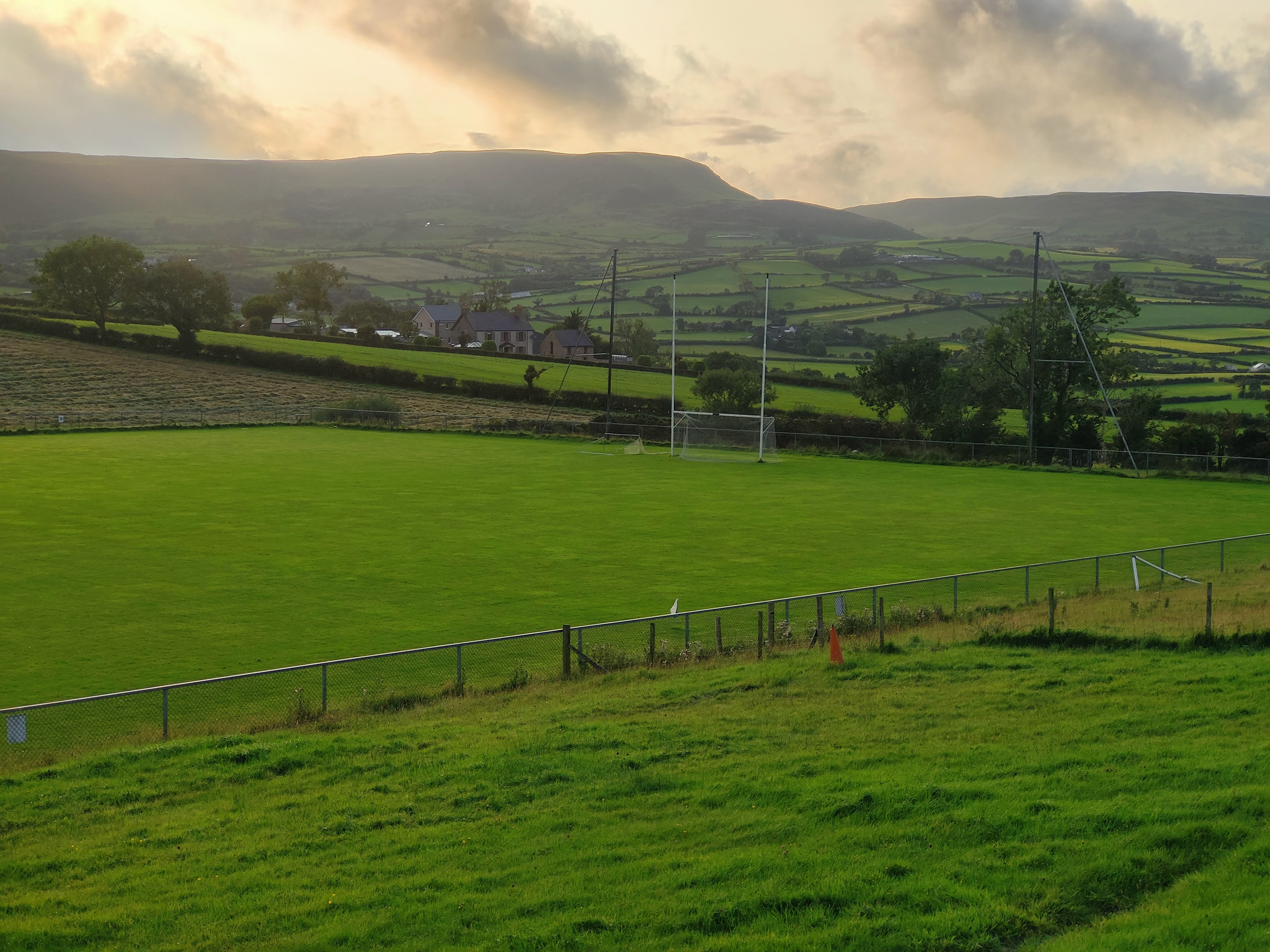
Brustin Brae

Latharna Óg play their home games at Brustin Brae, located about one mile from the town of Larne, County Antrim.

== Honours ==
- North Antrim Junior Hurling Championship (1): 1979
- Antrim Junior B Hurling Championship (1): 2019
