= Larne Town Hall =

Municipal structure in Northern Ireland

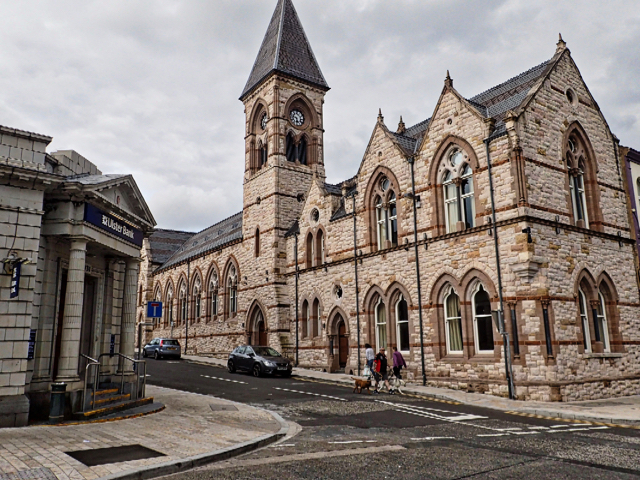
- Larne Town Hall

- Shown in Northern Ireland
- 54.8516°N 5.8216°W
- Location: Upper Cross Street, Larne

History
- Built: 1870

Site notes
- Architect: Alexander Tate
- Architectural style: Gothic Revival style

Listed Building – Grade B+
- Official name: Town Hall
- Designated: 25 June 1979
- Reference no.: HB 06/12/002

Larne Town Hall is a municipal structure in Upper Cross Street in Larne, County Antrim, Northern Ireland. The structure, which was the meeting place of Larne Borough Council, is a Grade B+ listed building.

== History ==
The town hall was financed by a donation by the Ulster-Scots merchant, Charles McGarel. It was designed by Alexander Tate in the Gothic Revival style, built Stewart & Company of Belfast in rubble masonry at a cost of £5,500 and was officially opened on 25 August 1870.

The design involved an asymmetrical main frontage with eleven bays facing onto Upper Cross Street with the left hand end bay projected forward as a pavilion; the central bay featured a four-stage clock tower with an arched doorway flanked by colonettes in the first stage, a lancet window in the second stage, an oculus in the third stage and a belfry with a clock and a pyramidal roof in the fourth stage. The left hand section featured six tall arched traceried windows on a single floor, while the right hand section was slightly set back and featured tall arched traceried windows on two floors. The traceried windows in both sections took the form of pairs of lancet windows separated by colonettes. The left hand end bay formed a caretaker's house. Internally, the principal rooms were the assembly hall, known as the "McGarel Hall", in the left hand section, the public reading room on the ground floor of the right hand section and the library and museum on the first floor of the right hand section.

The town was advanced to the status of municipal borough, with the town hall as its headquarters, in 1938. It also became a significant events venue and performers included the singer, Bridie Gallagher, in 1949, but it ceased to be the local seat of government when the council relocated to the Sir Thomas Dixon Buildings in the early 1960s. An extensive programme of refurbishment works, as well as the demolition of an existing annex and the construction of a new three-storey extension, was carried out by Tracey Brothers and completed in 2012. After particularly bad winter storms in March 2013, the Prince of Wales visited the town hall in June 2013 and met with members of the farming community who had been adversely affected by the extreme weather.

In June 2020, Amnesty International asked for the McGarel Hall to be renamed on the basis that, as a young man, McGarel had owned at least 1,000 slaves at a sugar plantation in Demerara in South America, and that part of his wealth had been generated from the compensation he had received for the loss of those slaves. Council officials said that they had no plans to change the name.

== See also ==
- List of Grade B+ listed buildings in County Antrim
