= Norman Apsley =

Irish physicist

Norman Apsley is an Irish physicist who is the former chief executive officer of Catalyst Inc in Belfast, formerly known as the Northern Ireland Science Park.

Apsley is a board member of Matrix, the Northern Ireland Science Industry Panel. He is also a member of the Advisory Board of the Institute of Electronics, Communications and Information Technology (ECIT) at The Queen's University of Belfast. He was appointed an honorary professor at the University of Essex in 1989, and is also a visiting professor for the University of Ulster.

In 2011, he was elected as a Fellow of the Royal Academy of Engineering. In 2019, he was awarded an honorary degree from Queen's University Belfast for services to business and commerce.

He was educated at Larne Grammar School, and then at the University of Ulster where he achieved a first class honours degree in Physics. He went on to study for a PhD in amorphous semiconductors at University of Cambridge's Cavendish Laboratory. Dr Apsley became a Fellow of Jesus College.
