= David Williams (astrochemist) =

British astronomer

- David Arnold Williams
- Born: 9 September 1937; Nottingham, UK
- Education: Ph.D.
- Alma mater: Queen's University, Belfast
- Spouse: Doreen Jane Bell
- Children: Richard and Alan
- Awards: OBE, RSA Gold Medal
- Scientific career
- Fields: Astrochemistry

David Arnold Williams (born 9 September 1937) is a retired British astrochemist and Emeritus Perren Professor of Astronomy at University College London.

== Background ==
He was born in Nottingham the son of Unitarian minister James Arnold and Frances Barbara (Begg) Williams. In 1945 the family moved to Larne, Northern Ireland where David was educated at Larne Grammar School. He entered Queen's University, Belfast, Northern Ireland to study mathematics, physics and chemistry and was awarded a B.Sc. in 1959 and a Ph.D. in 1963.

== Career ==
He was an assistant lecturer at the Manchester College of Science and Technology from 1963 to 1965, after which he was a research associate at the NASA Goddard Space Flight Center near Washington, D.C. from 1965 to 1967. He was then successively lecturer, reader and professor at the University of Manchester Institute of Science and Technology between 1967 and 1994. Since 1994 he has been a Professor of Astronomy at University College, London.

== Work ==
Professor Williams field of study is astrochemistry, involving the study of molecular line emissions in outer space to analyse and interpret the evolutionary process of the universe.

He led research groups at both Manchester and London and produced more than 300 publications in journals and books. His particular interests are the chemistry of the very early universe, the formation of low and high mass stars and the formation of hydrogen in the universe.

He served as President of the Royal Astronomical Society for 1998–2000.

== Honours and awards ==
He was awarded OBE in 2000.

In 2009 he was awarded the Gold Medal of the Royal Astronomical Society for Astronomy for his contributions to astronomy in the field of astrochemistry, applying it in progressive phases of star formation, from prestellar objects to protostars to the disks and planets found around young stars.

== Private life ==
He married Doreen Jane Bell in 1964, with whom he had two sons, Richard and Alan.
