= Angeline King =

Northern Irish writer

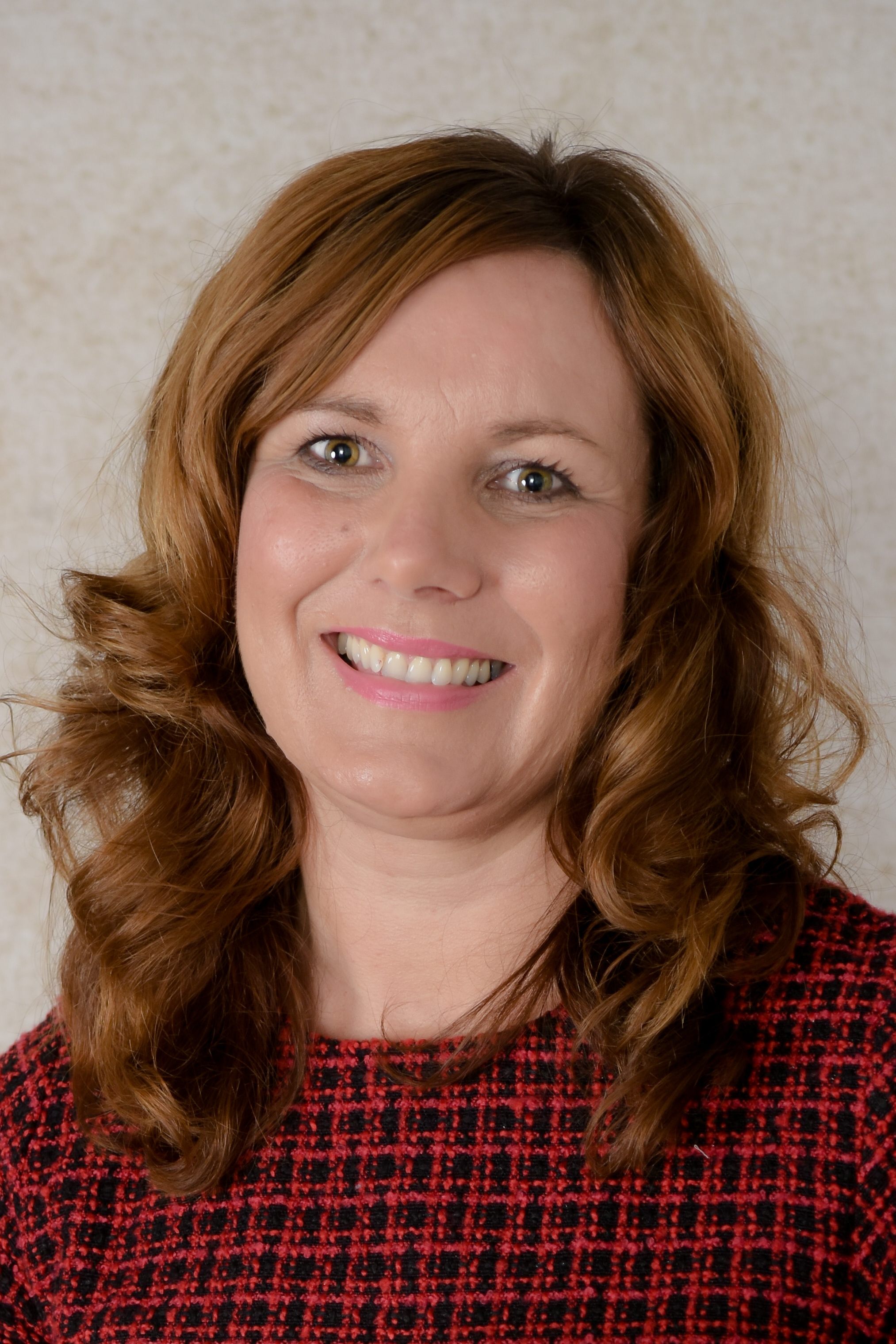
King in 2018

Angeline King (known professionally as Dr. Angeline Kelly) is a Northern Irish novelist, essayist and poet. Her work includes fiction, non-fiction and poetry, with a particular focus on Ulster, language, cultural memory, and shared cultural traditions. She has served as writer-in-residence at Ulster University's Coleraine campus, holds a PhD in English, and is known for including Ulster Scots language and international perspectives into contemporary Irish writing.

== Writing career ==
=== Fiction ===
King's debut novel, Snugville Street (2015) depicted a French exchange between the working class, Protestant Shankill area of Belfast and Brittany in France, and was described as "enjoyable" in a review in The Irish Times. Her second novel, A Belfast Tale (2016), continued this engagement with urban community and identity. The novel was re-published as Road to Snugville Street in 2025. In Dusty Bluebells (2020), a family saga set largely in County Antrim, King made use of Ulster Scots dialect as a literary medium. In The Irish Times, Ruth McKee described the book as being "Pithy with Ulster Scots, old rhymes, cures and sayings, there is a sense of magic to it all". King subsequently translated Dusty Bluebells into Scots. In Scotland, the novel was compared to the work of Jessie Kesson: "Past haunts present across the generations. King gets inside her people... More Jessie Kesson than Kailyard".

A fourth novel, The Secret Diary of Stephanie Agnew (2025), addresses language and identity in Northern Ireland and draws on King’s childhood experiences. The short novel explores the history of east Antrim's Gaelic bards, the Ó Gnímh / Agnew, and considers the hereditary poets’ contribution, identity and history in the context of a contemporary diary novel.

Claire Mitchell, who described Dusty Bluebells as the first 'feminist' book she had read in Ulster Scots, included a chapter on Angeline King in The Ghost Limb, which considers 'Alternative Protestants and the Spirit of 1798'.

King was writer-in-residence at the Ulster University campus in Coleraine from 2020 to 2023.

== Selected works ==
King has published fiction, non-fiction and children's literature.

=== Novels ===
- Snugville Street (2015)
- A Belfast Tale (2016), re-published as Road to Snugville Street (2025)
- Dusty Bluebells (2020) & Dusty Bluebells Scots Edition (2021)
- The Secret Diary of Stephanie Agnew (2024)

=== Non-fiction ===
- Irish Dancing: The Festival Story (2018)

=== Children's literature ===
- Children of Latharna (2017)
