= Mark Haggan =

British businessman and activist

Mark Haggan is a UK-based businessman and charity activist, particularly in the fields of student volunteering, education and international development.Currently, he is the chairman of two British NGOs (The AIESEC Foundation, and the award winning READ International).

He is also a quoted source on both Corporate Social Responsibility and Graduate recruitment.

In 1989, Haggan founded the Larne Grammar School Conservation and Environmental Group whilst a pupil in response to a Blue Peter campaign, and in 2018, he represented the programme in awarding a Blue Peter Cloth Emblem to the teacher who had supported the group through its 30 years.

He has been recognised by the charity AIESEC in the UK, of which he is a former director, with various awards for his ongoing support and commitment.

Haggan is also a motor sport enthusiast and regularly hosts Driver Q&A sessions in the British Touring Car Championship.
