= InspecVision =

UK company

- Company type: Private limited Company
- Industry: Manufacture of optical precision instruments
- Headquarters: Newtownabbey, Northern Ireland, UK
- Website: https://inspecvision.com/

InspecVision Ltd., established in 2003, is a UK engineering company based in Mallusk, Northern Ireland. It is a manufacturing company that produces computer vision inspection systems. The company is one of several local companies created as spinoffs or inspired by research conducted at the Queen's University of Belfast.

== Technology ==
InspecVision specializes in the design and manufacture of 2D and 3D computer vision based measurement systems for inspection and reverse engineering. The product range includes the Planar 2D, the SurfScan, the Opti-Scan 3D, and the Acuity.

While there are many manufacturers of 3D computer vision systems, these systems utilize either 3D scanning technologies or a moving camera to measure an object or scene. InspecVision Ltd. produces primarily 2D or 2&1/2D as well as 3D computer vision systems. Customers include manufacturers of 2D and 3D components such as sheet metal components, O-rings, gaskets or plastic moldings. InspecVision has developed a technology which requires no moving parts, rather a single fixed ultra-high resolution digital camera is used to measure the entire object with a single image. These systems perform measurement times that are usually much less than a second. A completely static system also precludes the rigorous recalibration requirements of other moving camera or computer vision systems.

The InspecVision 2D inspection system, Planar, is the world's fastest. Using only a table, lights, and a PC, it can take hundreds of thousands of measurements in just 0.2 seconds. There are no moving components and the measurements are taken using a very high resolution camera, which scans parts placed on a backlit glass surface. It can be used for inspection and reverse engineering of flat opaque and semi-transparent parts. The Planar system has been designed specifically for speed, accuracy and ease of use. The 2D process can measure every feature completely. Planar can produce multiple report types automatically with minimal input from the operator. To inspect, the operator places the part on the measurement surface and with a single click or scan of a barcode. This patented technology has been the recipient of several international awards, including "Best Quality Control System" at the MACH 2006 MWP Awards and 2 SMART Awards.

The SurfScan integrates with the Planar 2D automatic inspection software to allow inspection of both the parts 2D shape and its 2 ½D features with a single click. The high-resolution digital camera of the measurement system captures more than 20 million data points in one second with a single scan.

The Opti-Scan 3D is a non-contact white light scanning system. The system consists of a projector and a high resolution camera mounted side by side. Scans are achieved by projecting a series of stripes onto the part; the projected stripes are then captured with the camera and the images analyzed to produce a 3D point cloud of the scanned surface. Because the system measures every visible surface every time it scans the part; it is likely to detect minuscule and extra features. In addition, because the optical CMM produces a measurement at every pixel in the camera; it can process the highly ordered data much more easily than the disordered point clouds from laser scanners mounted on traditional CMM devices. The InspecVision Opti-Scan systems use patented technology to create both surface and edge measurements achieving unprecedented levels of accuracy. Opti-Scan 3D can offer you single click inspection, mobile large volume scanning and is also the world's only system that can measure edges in 3D.

In 2017 InspecVision launched the Accuity system which is an automated, large field of view, telecentric gauging system that can scan in both 2D and 3D.

In April 2021, the company was awarded the Queens's Award for Enterprise: International Trade for outstanding export performance.
