= Catalyst (science park) =

Science park in Northern Ireland

Coordinates: 54.608°N 5.903°W

- Interactive map of the Catalyst area

General information
- Location: Belfast, Northern Ireland

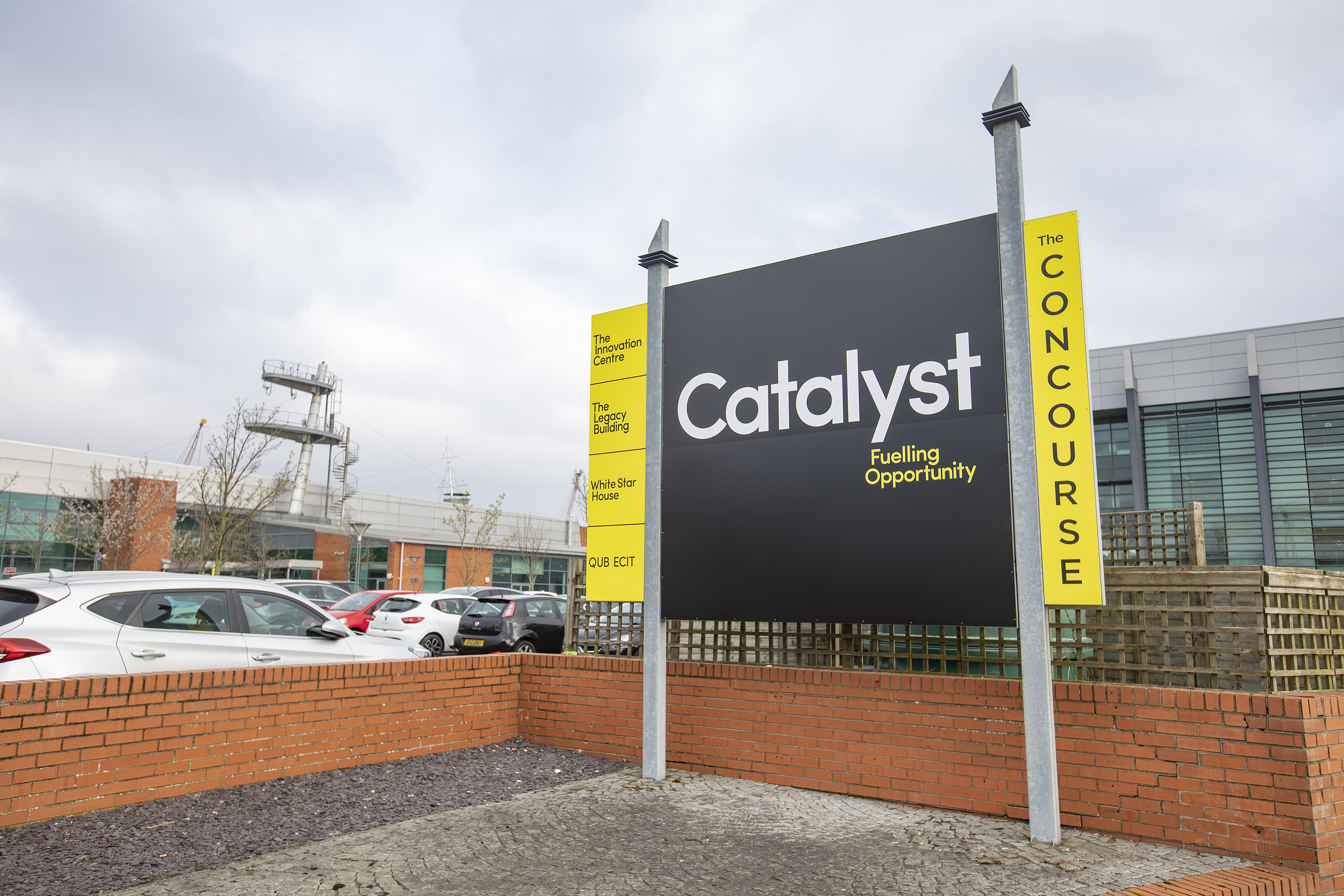
Catalyst - Titanic Quarter Belfast

Catalyst, formerly known as the Northern Ireland Science Park, was established in March 1999 to create a self-sustaining, internationally recognised, knowledge-based science park in Northern Ireland offering a commercial and research driven centre for knowledge-based industries. The park is headquartered in the Titanic Quarter, Queen's Island, Belfast, and hosts a range of international and local technology related companies. It currently has seven buildings in operation offering 210,000 square feet (20,000 m^{2}) of workspace Belfast's Titanic Quarter. 2700 engineers, researchers, entrepreneurs and executives work across the four Catalyst sites in Belfast, Derry and Ballymena.

The Chief Executive of Catalyst is Steve Orr OBE, who has held the position since November 2018. Orr succeeded the longstanding Chief Executive Dr Norman Apsley, who retired in November 2018. 2008 marked the first year of commercial independence from Government. The Park was re-branded Catalyst Inc in 2016 and Catalyst in 2019.

== Companies based at Catalyst ==
In November 2009 it was announced that software developers SAP were entering into strategic research collaboration with Intel at the site. At the same time, BroadSoft, which opened its European headquarters in the Science Park in 2006 and has since more than doubled its space requirement, announced further expansion to eventually bring total employment there to 23.
