= Carncastle =

Village in County Antrim, Northern Ireland

- Village and civil parish
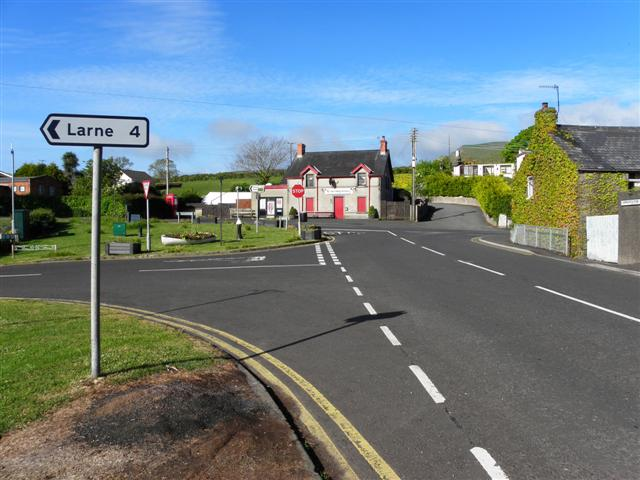
- Cairncastle Road

- Location in Northern Ireland
- Coordinates: 54°53′N 5°53′W
- Country: United Kingdom
- Division: Northern Ireland
- County: County Antrim

Carncastle or Cairncastle (from Irish carn, meaning 'mound', and the English word "castle") is a small village and civil parish in County Antrim, Northern Ireland. It is near the town of Larne and inland from the village of Ballygally. It had a population of 66 people in the 2001 Census. Carncastle is part of the Mid and East Antrim Borough Council area.

== Churches ==
Cairncastle Presbyterian Church is one of the oldest congregations of the Presbyterian Church in Ireland. The congregation was founded in 1646, four years after the foundation year of the Presbytery of Carrickfergus, which is the oldest presbytery in Ireland. The current minister is The Reverend Fiona Forbes, who was installed in 2014.

St Patrick's Church of Ireland has been the site of a church since medieval times. The date of its foundation is unknown, but it appears in the papal taxation of 1306 as Karkastell. In 1815, the present parish church was built. Repairs in the early 1860s saw the roof replaced, roughcast removed from the walls, and smaller panes inserted in the windows. The pulpit and reading desk were moved to the east end, and box pews replaced. The east window in St Patrick's was made by the Mayer Company in Munich. Further changes were made to St Patrick's in the twentieth century. The octagonal spire was rebuilt in 1960, and a Sunday School extension added in 1993. In 2007, following significant restoration, the church was rededicated by the Archbishop of Armagh, the Most Revd. Alan Harper. A brass plate on the church's font states that Dean Swift used it during his incumbency of Ballynure Parish in 1695. The churchyard has been used as a place of interment since the medieval period. Within the churchyard is a Spanish chestnut tree, locally known as the “Spanish Armada Tree”. According to local legend, this Spanish Sweet Chestnut tree sprouted from a seed carried in a dead sailor's pocket. Supposedly, the 16th-century Spanish Armada sailor buried beneath it had been carrying chestnuts with him while on his maritime journey, likely to ward off scurvy. Unfortunately for him, gales blew his ship off course, wrecking it on the Northern Ireland coast. The sailor's body washed up on the shores of Ballygally in 1588, where kind locals discovered the corpse and buried it in an unmarked grave at St Patrick's. But his grave did not remain unmarked for long as soon a sapling sprouted from the earth, now known locally as the Armada Tree.

== Knockdhu ==
Knockdhu (from Irish Cnoc Dubh, meaning 'black hill') is a Bronze Age promontory fort and settlement situated approximately one mile to the west of Cairncastle. The site consists of a set of three banks and ditches, Bronze Age roundhouses, and a probable gatehouse. It was excavated for the first time in 2008 for a Time Team episode that was first broadcast on 18 January 2009.

== Game of Thrones ==
In the 21st century, Cairncastle's profile was raised due to the filming of HBO's fantasy series Game of Thrones. Season One used the mountains above Cairncastle for the location where Ned Stark executed Will, the deserter from the Night's Watch. This was at Knock Dhu, a basalt escarpment above the village.

== Cairncastle Flute Band ==
The Cairncastle Flute Band is one of the oldest Protestant marching bands in Northern Ireland, having been formed around 1855–1859. The band hold their practice sessions in Cairncastle but the majority of their members come from the nearby town of Larne.

== See also ==
- List of villages in Northern Ireland
- List of civil parishes of County Antrim
