= Ballygally =

Village in County Antrim, Northern Ireland

- Village
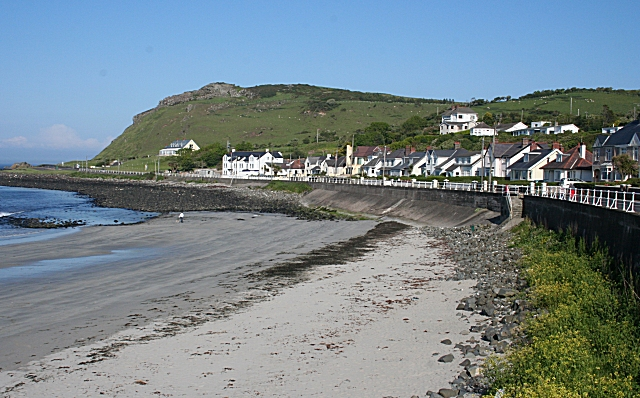
- Looking south at Ballygally beach and Ballygally Head

- Location within Northern Ireland
- Coordinates: 54°53′58″N 5°51′39″W
- Country: United Kingdom
- Province: Northern Ireland
- County: Antrim

Population (2001)
  - Total: 714

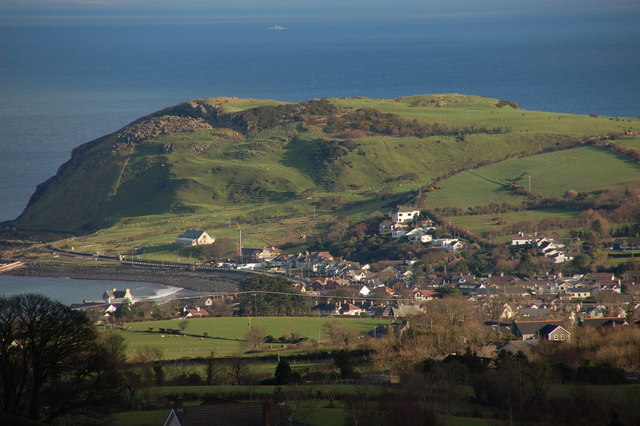
Ballygally Head

Ballygally or Ballygalley (from Irish Baile Geithligh, meaning 'Geithleach's townland', IPA:[ˈbˠalʲəˈɟɛhlʲiː]) is a village and holiday resort in County Antrim, Northern Ireland which lies on the Antrim coast, approximately 3 miles (5 kilometres) north of Larne. It is also a townland of 769 acres (311 hectares) and is situated in the civil parish of Carncastle and the historic barony of Glenarm Upper. It had a population of 821 in the 2011 census. It is located within the Mid and East Antrim Borough Council area.

== Archaeology ==
Archaeological excavations undertaken in the area in the 1990s, identified the remains of several Neolithic houses approximately 500m from the shore of Ballygally Bay. The site contained a number of finds, including worked flints, pottery and stone axes.

== Places of interest ==
Notable features include the headland of Ballygally Head, O'Haloran's Castle, The White Bear Rock, a sandy beach, Ballygally Castle and Ballygally Hall, which opened in 2011.

Ballygally beach is a destination for locals and for tourists, especially during the summer months.

Ballygally Castle, reputed to be the oldest occupied building in Ireland, has a reputation for being haunted. It sits in the middle of the village at the junction with the road to Cairncastle and contains a 4-star hotel with a bar and restaurant. The castle was built around 1625 for James Shaw of Greenock and is one of Ireland's best-preserved Scottish baronial style plantation houses.

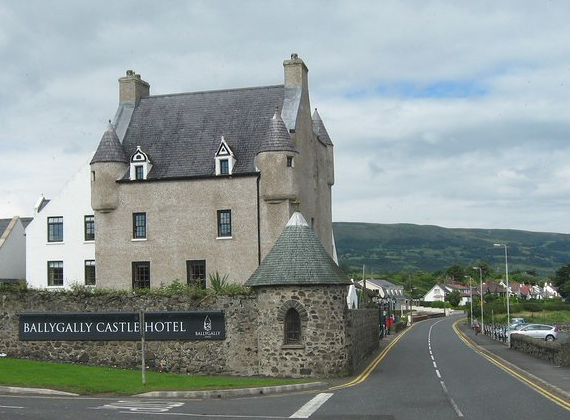
Ballygally Castle Hotel incorporates a 17th-century tower house

The bawn and walled garden are registered as Scheduled Historic Monuments at grid ref: D3725 0781.

Ballygally Hall is a two-storey building (funded by the Big Lottery, Larne Borough Council and NER) which opened in 2011 and includes a Spar shop with some Post Office facilities at ground level and a Community Hall on the first floor. The shop and restaurant, which previously existed next door to this site, were demolished in 2008. The Community Hall has weekly events and social activities throughout the year.

Cairndhu Golf Course, on top of Ballygally Head, overlooks the village and Carnfunnock Country Park (which offers a cafe, walled garden, caravan park and campsite, maze, children's playground, bouncy castle, mini-train rides, bungee runs, mini-golf, and nature walks) is nearby.

In 2014, Outdoor Recreation NI produced a report called 'Options to enhance access with the creation of a natural heritage trail between Ballygally Village and Carnfunnock Country Park' highlighting Ballygally's close links to the park.

== Demography ==
Ballygally is classified as a small village or hamlet by the Northern Ireland Statistics and Research Agency (NISRA) (i.e. with a population between 500 and 1,000 people). On Census day (29 April 2001) there were 714 people living in Ballygally. Of these:

- 21.6% were aged under 16 and 22.1% were aged 60 and over
- 49.0% of the population were male and 51.0% were female;
- 27.9% were from a Catholic background and 70.5% were from a Protestant background
- 2.3% of people aged 16–74 were unemployed.

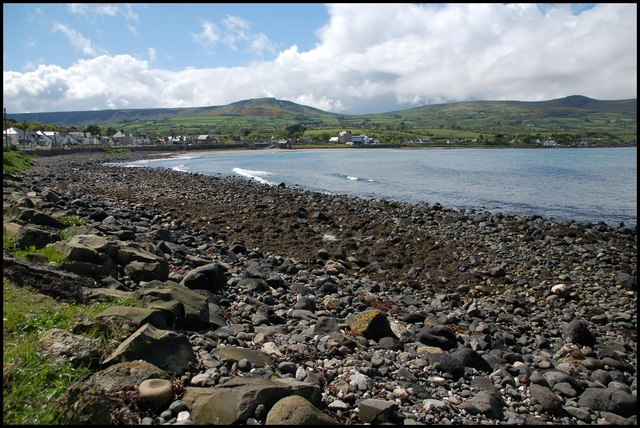
In the far distance, on the right, is the small peak of Scawt Hill. Six new minerals were discovered for the first time here, including scawtite and larnite.

== Biology ==
Ballygally Head was (in 1983) the only recorded location of Gelidiella calcicola from Northern Ireland.

== Geology ==
Ballygally Head is a volcanic plug, the ancient cooled remains of the pipe of a volcano.

Wedges of agglomerate have been found around Ballygally Head, showing that there were several stages of eruption, allowing tuff to form before the vent was blown out and once more filled with magma. There are tall columns in places around Ballygally Head, similar to the basalt columns found at the Giant's Causeway, but these are dolerite, a rock similar to basalt but which cooled more slowly, held inside the volcano vent, and so had time to grow larger crystals.

Scawt Hill, another volcanic plug 5 km west north west of Ballygally, is an internationally important site for geology due to the rare minerals found there. It is a protected Area of Special Scientific Interest.
