= St. Oliver Plunkett's Primary School =

St. Oliver Plunkett's Primary School may refer to:

- St. Oliver Plunkett's Primary School, Forkhill, Forkhill, County Armagh, Northern Ireland
- St. Oliver Plunkett's Primary School, Kilmore, Kilmore, County Armagh, Northern Ireland
