= Armagh Cricket Club =

Armagh
- Association: Northern Cricket Union of Ireland

Team information
- City: Armagh, Northern Ireland
- Founded: 1859
- Home ground: The Mall

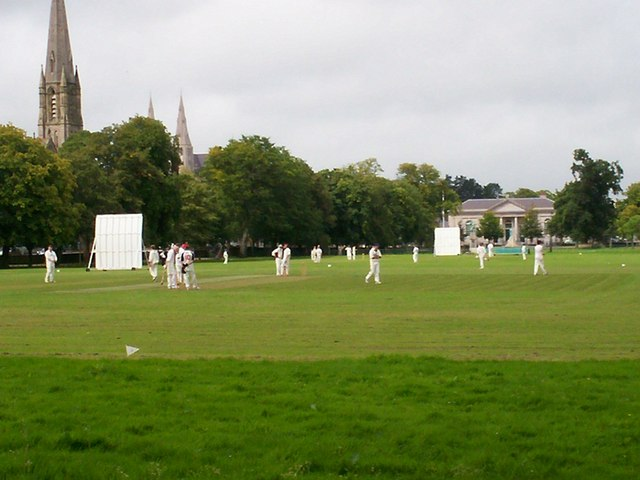
Armagh Cricket Club plays its home games at The Mall

Armagh Cricket Club is a cricket club in Armagh, County Armagh, Northern Ireland. The club, which was founded in 1859, was fielding teams in Section 1 of the NCU Senior League as of 2024.

== History ==
The club was formed in 1859. Originally playing as "a guest" on other pitches, by 1861 the club had obtained a lease for its own pitch on The Mall in Armagh. The club built a number of pavilions on the grounds, including in the early and mid-twentieth century, with the current building dating to the 1990s.

Teams from the club won the Northern Cricket Union of Ireland's Senior League in 1928, 1931 and 1939, before being relegated from the Senior League in the 1950s. Armagh Cricket Club won the Twenty20 Shield in 2015.

Former players include the Indian international cricketer Yashpal Sharma, who played with the club between 1988 and 1990. Other former club members include Irish internationals Ivan Anderson, Lloyd Armstrong, John Barnes, Robert Barnes, Wilfred McDonough and Thomas Fitzgerald Ward.

== Honours ==
- NCU Senior League (3): 1928, 1931, 1939
- NCU Junior Cup (1): 2015
