= The Troubles in Armagh =

Overview of the Northern Ireland conflict

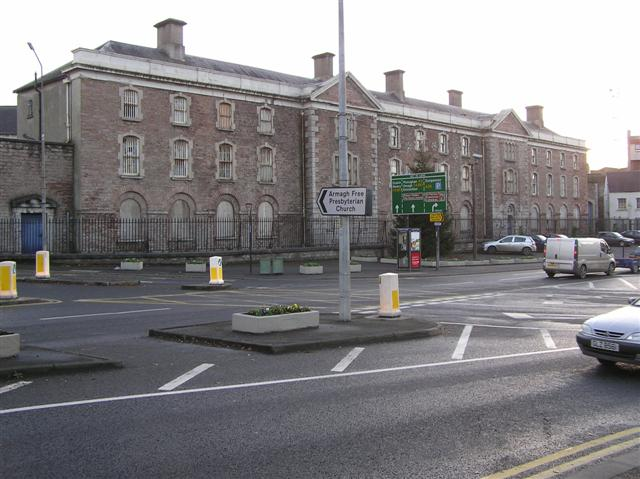
HM Prison Armagh, which housed female republican prisoners during the 1970s–80s.

The Troubles in Armagh recounts incidents during The Troubles in the town (from 1994, city) of Armagh, Northern Ireland; the violence was substantial enough for the city to be referred to by some as "Murder Mile". Over the course of the Troubles, although mainly concentrated in the years from 1969 until 1994, the small city of around 15,000 people, including some outlying areas, saw 86 deaths, including those of a number of people from the city who lost their lives elsewhere in Troubles-related incidents.

== 1969 ==
- 14 August 1969 – John Gallagher, a 30 year old married father of three children, became one of the first victims of the Troubles after being shot in the back by B-Specials members who opened fire on a crowd after trouble had erupted in the Shambles area of the city. Eyewitnesses have stated that Gallagher wandered into the crowd after leaving a pub under the influence of alcohol and had not been involved in any disorder. According to the Scarman tribunal set up to investigate events at the outbreak of the Troubles, the actions of the B-Specials in that incident amounted to 'grave misconduct'. in 1990, John Gallagher's daughter was injured in an IRA bomb attack which killed three Royal Ulster Constabulary members and a Catholic nun in the city.

== 1971 ==
- 10 August – Norman Watson, a 53 year old Protestant civilian and member of the Orange Order, was shot dead by the British Army in the Irish Street area during an exchange of fire with IRA members, after serious violence had erupted across Northern Ireland when internment without trial had been introduced on the previous day. Watson was driving in his car with his wife at the time and had not been involved in any violence.

== 1972 ==
- 29 March – Ruby Johnson, a 38 year old Protestant civilian from Ballintemple near Newtownhamilton in south Armagh, died seven weeks after suffering serious burns when the bus she was a passenger in was attacked by a gang of youths during trouble at the Ring Road area of the city. The inquest into her death heard that at least two petrol bombs were thrown through the windows of the Ulsterbus, setting her alight after the vehicle was engulfed in flames. Journalist Sean O'Hagan, who grew up in Armagh and whose father witnessed the incident, 30 years later wrote a piece on her death for the Guardian.
- 26 April – Lawrence Jubb, a 22 year old soldier with the Royal Engineers and from Doncaster, England, died when the recovery lorry he was driving overturned and trapped him and two other soldiers after it was stoned by children near the entrance to the Drumarg estate. According to the book Lost Lives, which chronicles every death in the Troubles up until the year 1999, local people were reported as attempting to rescue the trapped soldiers, including a nurse whose husband was a republican prisoner in the Long Kesh prison camp at the time.
- 7 August – In the third incident of its kind to take place within a small area of the city that year, Geoffrey Knipe, a 24 year old soldier from Bradford, England serving with the Royal Dragoon Guards was killed when youths said to be between the ages of 10 and 17 attacked his vehicle with stones at the Ring Road flyover, with one brick smashing through the front windscreen of his vehicle and hitting him on the head, killing him instantly.
- 25 October – John Michael Morrell, a 32 year old soldier from Macclesfield, England died 10 days after being injured in a Provisional IRA booby-trap explosion at a house in the heavily republican Drumarg estate which injured him and four other soldiers from the South Staffordshire Regiment. Lost Lives, the chronology which attempts to list the name of everyone who died in the Troubles, mistakenly lists his death as having occurred in south Armagh.
- 15 December – Frederick Greeves, a 40 year old member of the Ulster Defence Regiment (UDR) was shot dead on the Moy Road by the Official IRA outside the factory that he worked in. in 1974 a man was sentenced to life in prison for his killing.
- 18 December – William Johnson, a 48 year old local elected councillor for the Ulster Unionist Party and a member of the Police Authority, is found shot dead near the border after being taken by the Provisional IRA from a house in the Drumarg estate, where he had been carrying out work. Another man who had been abducted with him but later released unharmed, told a court that the gunmen who were questioning them in a vacant house in County Monaghan searched both men and found documents relating to the Police Authority on Johnston. According to Lost Lives, which chronicles the deaths of those who died in the Troubles, this is the likely reason that Johnston was shot dead.

== 1973 ==
- 7 April – Jake McGerrigan, a 17 year old member of the Official IRA, is shot dead in the Druid's Villas area by British troops of the Parachute Regiment, who also badly wounded fellow OIRA man John Nixon, later to take part in the 1980 republican hunger strike in the Maze Prison. The army, who had fired from the adjoining Windmill Hill, claimed that this was after they had come under fire from two positions in nearby Navan Street and that a few minutes after the reported firing they had spotted a number of armed men walking in a military-style formation and fired one shot towards them which passed through Jake McGerrigan and into John Nixon. However, civilian witnesses at the scene stated that they had seen no guns lying near the dead youth's body, and the inquest into his death heard swabs taken from his hands and those of John Nixon showed no traces of lead residue. He was given a full republican funeral at which an estimated 8000 mourners attended. Lost Lives, the chronology which attempts to list the name of everyone who died in the Troubles, mistakenly lists his death as having occurred in March.
- 9 April – Two days after the death of Jake McGerrigan, his friend and fellow Official IRA man 20-year-old Tony Hughes is shot dead in nearby Culdee by members of the Royal Regiment of Fusiliers. The dead man was the quartermaster for the group in north Armagh and had been moving guns into a car at the time in preparation for a retaliatory attack for the death of Jake McGerrigan. Official Republican leader Cathal Goulding gave the graveside oration at his funeral. Lost Lives, the chronology which attempts to list the name of everyone who died in the Troubles, mistakenly lists his death as having occurred in March.
- 13 August – William McIlveen, a 36 year old part-time member of the Royal Ulster Constabulary (RUC), is shot dead by the Provisional IRA at the gates of the factory on the Cathedral Road where he worked as a security guard. In 1982, the dead man's brother Wilfred, a former member of the UDR, will be killed by an IRA booby-trap bomb.
- 27 August – Kenneth Hill, a 24 year old corporal in the UDR, is shot dead in a gun battle with the Provisional IRA in the Culdee area of the city. Earlier in the day two large no-warning car bombs left by the loyalist Ulster Volunteer Force had exploded in streets nearby, miraculously killing no-one, and he had been in the area helping to clear it after a car parked there was wrongly thought to have contained another bomb. The dead man came from Drumsherriff, near Loughgall.

== 1974 ==
- 19 February - The Ulster Volunteer Force bomb the Catholic-owned Traynor's pub a few miles outside of Armagh city on the Armagh to Moy road, killing a Catholic, 46-year-old Patrick Molloy, and a Protestant member of the Orange Order, 49-year-old Jack Wylie. It is suspected that the particular UVF unit which carried out the massacre was part of what has become known as the Glenanne Gang, a particularly violent alliance of paramilitaries, policemen and soldiers within the UVF and which is thought to have been responsible for around 120 deaths, mostly of innocent Catholic civilians. In 1981 a self-confessed UVF man and neighbour of Jack Wylie was jailed for life for the bombing.
- 17 June – 34-year-old Geraldine Corrigan died two days after being shot by what is thought to have been a member of the Official IRA during a botched robbery at her family's supermarket on the Cathedral Road. According to the victim's sister-in-law, who was present at the time of the incident, two masked men entered demanding money and fired two shots into the ceiling when Corrigan refused to hand over any cash. After that a struggle ensued in which Corrigan was shot at point-blank range in the head. The gunmen then escaped in a Ford Cortina which was found abandoned a short time later in the Windmill Hill area of the city. She left behind a husband and three children.

== 1975 ==
- 24 March – William Elliott, a-52-year old Protestant civilian from Ashley Gardens in the city is shot dead by the Provisional IRA in the village of Silverbridge in south Armagh, after being mistaken for a police officer. Elliott had gone to investigate a robbery at a post office in the village, which the RUC believed had been set up to lure police into the area, when gunmen fired about 30 shots at him and his colleague. Elliott died at the scene. He had served in the Royal Navy in the Second World War and had been head postmaster in Armagh city from 1960 until 1972.
- 15 August – Norman Kerr, a 28-year-old Protestant from Portadown was shot dead by the Provisional IRA in Market Street in the city centre bar where he worked as a DJ. The dead man was a close friend of UVF member Harris Boyle who had died in the Miami Showband Massacre the month before. The IRA claimed it was in possession of Harris Boyle's diary, which had been stolen from a swimming pool in Portadown, and that it had killed Kerr because of an alleged association with undercover British Army operative Robert Nairac.
- 22 August – The UVF's Glenanne Gang launched a gun and bomb attack on McGleenan's Bar on Upper English Street in the Shambles area of the city. One gunman opened fire while another planted the bomb. It exploded as they ran to a getaway car, causing the building to collapse. John McGleenan (45), Patrick Hughes (30) and Thomas Morris (22), all Catholic civilians, were killed. Thomas Morris died six days later on 28 August.

== 1976 ==
- 25 January – David McDowell, a 26-year-old member of the UDR from Alexander Park in the city, is accidentally shot dead by a member of the Queen's Dragoon Guards at an army observation post near the border which had come under sustained IRA fire earlier in the day. He had stopped his bus to talk to soldiers when one of them accidentally discharged his gun, shooting McDowell dead. He had survived an IRA bid on his life three years previously.
- 9 April – 73-year-old Catholic pensioner Michael Sweeney is killed when the UVF launch a bomb attack on Lenny's Bar in the Railway Street area of the city, which also injuries 14 other people. The dead man was a World War II veteran and had taken part in the Dunkirk evacuation.
- 26 October – Joseph Wilson, a 53-year-old part-time member of the UDR is shot dead by a Provisional IRA gunman in the supermarket he worked at in the nationalist Shambles area of the city. He was married and had nine children. In 1984, his son-in-law Herbert Burrows will be killed in an IRA booby-trap explosion close to the scene of Wilson's death.

== 1977 ==
- 18 October – 67-year-old Protestant Herbert John Anderson is shot dead by the Provisional IRA who ambushed his taxi on the Armagh to Keady road. The dead man had been in the RUC but had retired from the police two years earlier. He was from Barrack Street in the city. In 1980 a 20-year-old man from Keady was given a life sentence for Herbert's killing and those of three others.

== 1979 ==
- 19 April – Agnes Wallace (40), a Prison Officer, was killed and three female colleagues were injured in an Irish National Liberation Army gun and grenade attack outside Armagh women's prison. They had just left the prison when a hand grenade was thrown from a passing car and shots were fired. She had joined the Northern Ireland Prison Service in January 1979 and was the first female Prison Officer to be killed in the Troubles.
- 2 June – Alan Dunne (36), an off-duty member of the RUC, and David Stinson (32), a civilian, both Protestants, were shot dead by the Irish National Liberation Army (INLA) while standing outside Dunne's home, Ballinahone Crescent, Armagh.
- 9 June – Peadar McElvenna, a 24-year-old Provisional IRA member from Convent Close in the city, is shot dead after an IRA attack on the RUC barracks in Keady, south Armagh. Although from Armagh city, he was a member of the IRA's South Armagh Brigade.
- 31 July – George Walsh, a 51-year-old member of the RUC, was shot dead when two INLA gunmen opened fire on the car he was sitting in outside Armagh Courthouse on the Mall. The courthouse sits on the opposite side of the Mall to Armagh's women's prison where prison officer Agnes Wallace was killed earlier in the year in an IRA attack. The courthouse was almost demolished in an IRA bomb attack in 1993 and had to be rebuilt.
- 2 August – Two British soldiers are killed in a Provisional IRA landmine explosion on the Cathedral Road. Paul Reece of the Royal Signals, and Richard Furminger of the Royal Artillery (both aged 19) died when their convoy was hit with the 400 lb culvert bomb. At least three gunmen also opened fire simultaneously with the explosion. The soldiers had been on their way back from inspecting a burnt-out car which had been used in the INLA killing of RUC man George Walsh two days previously outside Armagh Courthouse.
- 16 October – 25-year-old Tony McClelland, from the Drumarg estate in Armagh city, died during a Garda chase in County Monaghan. He was a member of the INLA and been moving rifles in the car when the Garda gave chase. The INLA confirmed that he was on active service for them at the time of his death. The driver of the car was the 'Border Fox' Dessie O'Hare.

== 1980 ==
- 28 December – 40-year-old Catholic Territorial Army sergeant-major Hugh McGinn is shot dead by the INLA at the door of his Umgola Villas home. In 1985, two INLA men, supergrass Harry Kirkpatrick, and Gerard 'Dr Death' Steenson, who was later to be shot dead in an inter-republican feud, were convicted of killing McGinn, although Gerard Steenson's conviction was overturned the following year.

== 1981 ==
- 2 April – 23-year-old RUC man Kenneth Acheson from Ballynahone Drive in the city dies when a Provisional IRA booby-trap bomb explodes under his car as he drives home from Bessbrook police station in south Armagh. He was married and had one child.
- 23 April – 38-year-old Protestant John Robinson is shot dead by the Provisional IRA outside the Mullacreevie estate. Robinson was a former member of the UDR. He was driving his minibus when a car pulled up beside it and a gunman opened fire on him.
- 8 November – 17-year-old Protestant Trevor Forster dies in a Provisional IRA booby-trap bomb explosion meant for his father, a member of the UDR. The dead youth, from the townland of Ballymoran just outside Armagh city, was learning to drive and had offered to put his father's car in the garage when the explosion happened.
- 10 November – Charles Neville, a 56-year-old Protestant and former member of the UDR, is killed in a Provisional IRA gun and grenade attack on his car at the Loughgall Road. He had left the UDR the year before.

== 1982 ==
- 24 January – Tony Harker, a 21-year-old Catholic civilian, is shot dead by the UDR in disputed circumstances outside a supermarket on the Keady Road. He along with another man were apparently intending to break into the supermarket when Harker was shot by members of a UDR patrol. He was on bail at the time of his death charged with having petrol bombs for use in rioting, and was prominent in anti H-Block marches in the city; and in 1980 he had been mentioned in the Republican News as being the subject of ongoing alleged harassment by the police and army, leading to accusations that he was deliberately targeted by the UDR members who opened fire on him. Another local man mentioned in the same article was Roddy Carroll, who would also be shot dead by the RUC later that same year.
- 27 August – Wilfred McIlveen, a 37-year-old Protestant and former member of the UDR, is killed when a Provisional IRA booby-trap bomb explodes under his car as he was leaving Milford Everton Football Club's grounds. The dead man was married to a Catholic. His brother, William McIlveen, a member of the RUC, had been shot dead by the Provisional IRA in the city in 1973.
- 7 October – Frederick Williamson, a 33-year-old member of the UDR from Orangefield Drive in the city, is killed along with 28-year-old prison officer Elizabeth Chambers from Broughshane in County Antrim when his car is hit by bullets fired in an INLA ambush on the Armagh to Moy road. Williamson's car careened out of control after being struck with the bullets and smashed head-on into Miss Chambers car, causing both their deaths. She had been on her way to work in the Armagh women's prison. A car used by the killers was later found in the Mullacreevie estate on the edge of Armagh city.
- 25 October – 47-year-old Sinn Féin election worker Peter Corrigan is shot dead while walking along the Loughgall Road from his home at Drumbreda Avenue. The killing was claimed by the Protestant Action Force (PAF) a cover name for the UVF. A UDR soldier was later convicted of the killing. Corrigan's teenage son Martin Corrigan witnessed his father being shot dead. He was himself later shot dead by the British army in 1991.
- 10 November – Charles Spence, a 44-year-old part-time UDR man, is shot dead by the Provisional IRA at the customs offices where he worked on the Monaghan Road in the city. The dead man was from Knockamell Park in Armagh city. The customs building itself was later destroyed in an IRA bomb attack in 1986.
- 27 November – 34-year-old former RUC member John Martin is shot dead by the Provisional IRA at his filling station on the Mall. Martin was from Knockamell Park in the city and was a neighbour of Charles Spence, who had been shot dead by the IRA two weeks previously.
- 12 December 1982 – Seamus Grew (31) and Roddy Carroll (22), both members of the INLA, were shot dead while unarmed by undercover RUC members at a vehicle checkpoint at Mullacreevie Park. This became the third recent incident after which allegations were made that security forces were operating a 'shoot to kill' policy in County Armagh. Their deaths were subsequently investigated by John Stalker as part of his investigation into the Shoot-to-kill policy in Northern Ireland. Both men would later have brothers killed in the Troubles. Their deaths were featured in the 1990 film Shoot to Kill.
- 20 December – Austin Smith, a 44-year-old Catholic member of the UDR, is shot dead by the Provisional IRA as he returned to his home on the Windmill estate in a heavily nationalist part of the city. He was returning from his shift at Drumadd Barracks.

== 1983 ==
- 21 February – 29-year-old on-duty RUC sergeant William Gordon Wilson is killed when a Provisional IRA bomb is detonated behind the door of a derelict pub in the nationalist Shambles area close to the city centre. His killing happened one day before his 30th birthday. Originally from Warrenpoint in County Down he lived in the Jubilee Park area of Armagh city.
- 9 March – James Hogg, a 23-year-old Protestant civilian and member of the Orange Order, was shot dead in what is thought to have been a sectarian revenge attack by the INLA. He was finishing work building garages at the back of the Housing Executive offices on Dobbin Street when the gunman struck. According to Lost Lives, it is assumed that he was killed in retaliation for a UVF gun attack on a Catholic man in the city earlier that day.
- 13 April – 38-year-old Territorial Army sergeant Trevor Elliott from Alexander Gardens in the city is shot dead by the Provisional IRA as he walked from his shop in Keady, south Armagh. Elliott was press officer for the Armagh branch of the Democratic Unionist Party.
- 30 July – Martin Malone, an 18-year-old unarmed Catholic civilian, is shot dead by a UDR patrol in the Callan Street area. He was among a group of youths who were asked for ID by the patrol, and when an argument then broke out between them and the UDR members he was shot once in the chest at point blank range. The patrol then immediately fled the scene, the police (once informed) took over 4 hours to respond. The UDR member who fired the fatal shot was later brought to court on manslaughter charges but was found not guilty in the non-jury trial.
- 7 September – 61-year-old Catholic RUC man John Wasson is shot dead by the INLA outside his Duke's Grove home in a nationalist area of the city. He was due to retire in five weeks.
- 8 November – Adrian Carroll, a 24-year-old hard-of-hearing Catholic civilian, is shot dead outside his home on Abbey Street by on-duty UDR man Neil Latimer. Latimer, along with three other UDR men, who became known as the UDR Four, were found guilty of his killing, with the other three later being released on appeal. The Protestant Action Force, a cover name for the UVF, claimed that it was behind the killing. The cover name had also been used by the UVF the year before to claim responsibility for the killing of Peter Corrigan in Armagh city, for which a serving UDR soldier was later convicted. Carroll's brother Roddy Carroll, an INLA member, had been shot dead in the city the year before. In the weeks leading up to his death, Adrian Carroll had reported many instances of alleged UDR harassment, including his speech being mocked and threats to kill him. Some of Carroll's brothers were involved in republican activity but he had no involvement in politics.
- 14 November – Ulster Unionist Party (UUP) chairman of Armagh District Council and part-time major in the UDR Charles Armstrong is killed in a Provisional IRA booby-trap bomb explosion as he sat in his car outside the council's headquarters at the Palace Demesne. Inside the council chambers that night Charles Armstrong had called for councillors to stand for a minute's silence for Adrian Carroll, who had been shot dead six days earlier in the city. This led to angry scenes as elected DUP members refused to stand. Armstrong was from St Mark's Place on the Mall. The satirist and liberal unionist commentator Newton Emerson was a nephew of the dead man and wrote about his death for the Irish Times.

== 1984 ==
- 3 March – Herbert Burrows, a 37-year-old Protestant civilian, is killed when a Provisional IRA booby-trap bomb which was attached to a door at his Alexander Road funeral parlour exploded, killing him instantly. The IRA claimed that he was a member of the UDR, something that was denied by the police and army. Burrows came from Ballinahone Avenue in the city. His father-in-law, Joseph Wilson, a member of the UDR, had been shot dead by the Provisional IRA a short distance away in 1976.
- 29 April – Thomas McGeary, a 48-year-old Catholic civilian, is killed by a booby-trap bomb planted in his car just outside Armagh city. A group calling itself 'The Irish Freedom Fighters' claimed responsibility for his death, claiming that McGeary was a 'collaborator', but the killing was widely blamed on the Provisional IRA, who were accused of using a cover name to try and deflect blame for an unpopular action. In a statement released by the IRA at the time they denied any role in it. In 2014, an article appeared in the Sinn Féin newspaper An Phoblacht condemning the killing.
- 17 December – The Officer Commanding (OC) of the Armagh city Provisional IRA, 33-year-old Sean McIlvenna, is killed by the RUC in Blackwatertown, a small village a few miles from Armagh. He had been leading an IRA unit which had just injured seven UDR soldiers, two of whom received amputations, in a 1000 lb landmine explosion when RUC officers arrived in an armoured car and opened fire on the IRA men as they escaped through a field. McIlvenna was hit by one bullet and died at the scene. He was originally from North Belfast.

== 1985 ==
- 17 February – Catholic prison officer Patrick Kerr is shot dead by the Provisional IRA on his 37th birthday as he left 10.30 a.m Mass with his children at St Patrick's RC Cathedral in the city. Catholic Cardinal of Ireland Tomás Ó Fiaich was in his residence a short distance away and came to the scene. Kerr was from Folly Park in the city and at the time of his death had worked at the Maze Prison.
- 21 February – 30-year-old Catholic RUC member Frank Murphy is shot dead by the Provisional IRA at the gates of Drumsallen Primary School on the Battleford Road just outside Armagh city. He had just left children back to the school after they had attended a quiz the Royal School in Armagh and was driving his bus out the gates when the shooting happened. He had previously been injured in an IRA gun and grenade attack on Keady RUC barracks in 1973.

== 1986 ==
- 1 January 1986 – James McCandless (39) and Michael Williams (24), both members of the RUC, were killed by a Provisional IRA remote controlled bomb hidden in a litter bin in Thomas Street and detonated when their foot patrol passed by at one minute into the new year. An IRA unit had taken over a house in Ogle Street and waited until the RUC foot patrol came into range of the 5 lb device. Lost Lives, the chronology which attempts to list the name of everyone who died in the Troubles, mistakenly claims that the bombing occurred in Portadown, although both officers did come from the county Armagh town.
- 16 June – Terence McKeever, a 31-year-old Armagh businessman is abducted and then shot dead by the Provisional IRA, with his body being left near the village of Cullyhanna in south Armagh. From Armagh city, although at the time living in Dublin, he had come under threat because his business, McKeever Brothers, had been carrying out work on RUC and British Army bases. He had been travelling from his home in Dublin to his place of work in Armagh city when he was abducted by the IRA somewhere near the border. A booby-trap bomb intended to kill police and soldiers was left near his body. The rifle used to kill him was found to have been used in 16 other shootings, including the killing of two senior RUC officers in what became known as the Jonesborough ambush. McKeever's sister, Karen McAnerney, alleged Garda Síochána collusion with the IRA in his death, although the Garda Síochána Ombudsman Commission later ruled against her. His funeral Mass took place in St Patrick's Roman Catholic Cathedral in Armagh city, where he had been married three months previously.

== 1987 ==
- 5 February – Irish People's Liberation Organisation (IPLO) member Tony McCluskey is abducted by the rival INLA from his home in Mullaghmatt in Monaghan town in the Republic of Ireland and shot dead after being tortured and mutilated, with his body being left near the village of Middletown in County Armagh. He was killed as part of a bloody feud between the IPLO and the INLA, from whom the former organisation had broken away. 'Border Fox' Dessie O'Hare later admitted to the Sunday Tribune newspaper that he was responsible for McCluskey's death, saying that "We just wanted to kill him – to give him a hard death. They were a bad crowd. I had a deep hate for McCluskey and all those guys. I did not want him to die lightly." Although living in Monaghan at the time of his death, McCluskey was from Armagh city and was taken back to it for burial.
- 21 March – INLA member Kevin Barry Duffy is shot dead in the grounds of St Brigid's High School in the Nursery Road area of the city. He had been abducted by members of the rival IPLO and taken to the school where he was then shot five times. His killing was part of the same feud which had seen the death of Tony McCluskey one month earlier. The feud had started two months before on 20 January when the IPLO shot dead INLA leaders Thomas "Ta" Power and John O'Reilly in a hotel in Drogheda in County Louth and ended after Kevin Barry Duffy's death with 11 dead.

== 1988 ==
- 25 September – 22-year-old UDR member Stephen McKinney is shot dead by the Provisional IRA on the Cabragh Road on the outskirts of Armagh. He had just finished his last shift in the regiment when he was shot outside his home. SDLP MP Seamus Mallon visited the family home to condemn the killing. A few days later in the chambers of Armagh District Council there were angry scenes when a Sinn Féin councillor disrupted a moment's silence for the dead man.

== 1989 ==
- 17 November – David Halligan, a 57-year-old UDR member, is shot dead by the Provisional IRA on the Hamiltonsbawn Road on the outskirts of the city. He had just left Drumadd Barracks and was on his way to nearby Richhill when the gunmen struck.

== 1990 ==
- 22 January – Derek Monteith, a 35-year-old inspector in the RUC, is shot dead by the Provisional IRA in the kitchen of his home in Kilburn Park off the Portadown Road in the city. He was the 267th RUC officer to die in the Troubles.
- 28 March – In an identical attack to the one that killed Derek Monteith, 58-year-old RUC member George Starrett is shot dead in the kitchen of his home on the Newry Road by the Provisional IRA. His younger brother, a member of the UDR, had lost both legs in an IRA attack on the Mall in 1982.
- 18 April – IPLO member Martin Corrigan from Railway Street in the city is shot dead by British Army soldiers at Kinnego, a few miles from Armagh. He had been in the garden of an RUC member's house and was getting ready to launch an attack on him when undercover soldiers shot him during a gun-battle. He was the only IPLO member to die while attacking state forces. When he was 17 he had witnessed his father Peter Corrigan, a Sinn Féin member, being shot dead by the UVF in the city.
- 24 July 1990 – Joshua Willis (35), William Hanson (37) and David Sterritt (34), all members of the RUC, and Sister Catherine Dunne, a 37-year-old Catholic nun, were killed in a Provisional IRA land mine attack on an RUC armoured patrol car at the Killylea Road on the outskirts of the city. Sr Dunne was the driver of a car coming in the opposite direction from the RUC vehicle when the explosion happened. A passenger in her car, Cathy McCann, was injured in the explosion. She was the daughter of John Gallagher, who had been shot dead by the B Specials in the city in the early days of the Troubles. David Sterritt was from Markethill, Joshua Willis was from Caledon, and William Hanson from the Killycapple Road just outside the city. The bomb contained at least 1,000 pounds of explosives and left a 20-foot crater in the road. Two men, Henry McCartney (26) and Tarlac Connolly (29), were charged with the killings. They were later given life sentences but were released in 2000 under the terms of the Good Friday Agreement.

== 1991 ==
- 1 March – 24-year-old Paul Sutcliffe, who came from Lancashire in England, and 20-year-old Roger Love, from Richhill, both members of the UDR, were killed when the Provisional IRA ambushed their patrol on the Killylea Road, about half a mile from the site of an IRA bomb attack which had killed three RUC officers and a nun the previous year. Their armoured Land Rover was hit with a horizontal-firing homemade mortar bomb after it had stopped at temporary traffic lights at the bottom of the Mullacreevie housing estate. Private Love died from his injuries on 4 March. The incident became known as the Mullacreevie Ambush.
- 3 May – 56-year-old Robert Orr, an ex-member of the RUC, is killed when a Provisional IRA booby-trap bomb explodes under his car as he drove along the Mall in the centre of Armagh. He was from Ashley Heights in the city and was a leading member of the Orange Order. He had left the RUC 15 years previously and the police rejected an IRA claim that he had been identified as a UDR member who had taken part in recent house searches in the city.

== 1992 ==
- 24 February - Anne Marie Smyth, a 26-year-old Catholic mother of two from the Longstone estate in Armagh is murdered in east Belfast by the UVF after she attended what was meant to be a party in a loyalist area. She had gone to Belfast after spending some of the night drinking in Armagh, and had fallen in with a crowd of loyalist men and women who, realising that she was a Catholic from Armagh, took her to a house on Cregagh Street on the pretense of having a party. When there, Ms Smyth was followed upstairs by five men, who savagely beat and strangled her. She was then carried out of the house and taken away in the boot of a car to Ballarat Street where she had her throat slashed back to the spine. Five men, including one who was described by police in court as the UVF's East Belfast commander, and two women, were later jailed on various charges in connection with her death. One of the men who killed her, long-time UVF member Stephen Manners, was himself shot dead by loyalist paramilitaries in 2001 in what is thought to have been an internal hit.
- 18 April 1992 – Brendan McWilliams (50), a Catholic civilian employee of the British Army, was shot and killed by the IRA at his home at Nialls Crescent, off the Killylea Road.

== 1993 ==
- 9 February – Michael Beswick (21), a member of the British Army, was killed in Cathedral Road, Armagh, when a remote-controlled bomb hidden by the Provisional IRA in a wall exploded as an army foot patrol was passing by.
- 24 February - Reginald Williamson, a 46-year-old RUC member from Armagh, is killed when a Provisional IRA booby-trap bomb explodes under his car near the village of Loughgall. His Catholic girlfriend was driving behind him in her car when the explosion happened. They had been for a night out in the County Tyrone village of Moy. In 1982, Williamson's brother Frederick Williamson had been killed along with prison officer Elizabeth Chambers in an INLA ambush on the Moy Road.

== 1994 ==
- 28 April - Eric Smyth, a 40-year-old ex-member of the UDR, is shot dead by the Provisional IRA at the front of his home on Salter's Grange Road, on the outskirts of Armagh. The IRA wrongly claimed that he was a serving member of the Royal Irish Regiment. His widow had lost her brother, Brian McCoy, in the UVF attack on the Miami Showband in 1975.
- 18 May – Gavin McShane (17) and Shane McArdle (17), both Catholic civilians, were shot dead by the Ulster Volunteer Force, while in a taxi depot, Lower English Street, Armagh. Gavin McShane died instantly and Shane McArdle 24 hours later. A taxi driver was also injured in the attack.
- 21 May – Reginald McCollum (19), an off-duty member of the Royal Irish Regiment, was abducted and shot dead by the IRA at a field near Mullacreevie housing estate, Armagh. He had been on a stag night with friends, before being abducted, interrogated and shot nine times. He was the third member of his family to be killed in the Troubles.

== Sources ==
- McKittrick, David; Kelters, Seamus; Feeney, Brian; Thornton, Chris (2001). Lost Lives: The Stories of the Men, Women and Children who Died as a Result of the Northern Ireland Troubles. Mainstream. ISBN 978-1-84018-504-1.
- Sutton, Malcolm (1994). An index of deaths from the conflict in Ireland, 1969–1993. Belfast: Beyond the Pale Publications. ISBN 0-9514229-4-4. OCLC 32200430.
