= Thomas Ward (cricketer) =

Irish cricketer

Personal information
- Full name: Thomas Fitzgerald Ward
- Born: 14 February 1905; Armagh, Ireland
- Died: 2 July 1989 (aged 84); Dublin, Leinster, Ireland
- Batting: Right-handed
- Bowling: Right-arm fast

Domestic team information
- Years: Team
- 1936–1939: Ireland

Career statistics
| Competition | First-class |
|---|---|
| Matches | 2 |
| Runs scored | 7 |
| Batting average | 7.00 |
| 100s/50s | –/– |
| Top score | 3* |
| Balls bowled | 312 |
| Wickets | 5 |
| Bowling average | 27.80 |
| 5 wickets in innings | – |
| 10 wickets in match | – |
| Best bowling | 2/31 |
| Catches/stumpings | 1/– |
- Source: Cricinfo, 2 November 2018

Thomas Fitzgerald Ward (14 February 1905 – 2 July 1989) was an Irish first-class cricketer.

Ward was born at Armagh in February 1905, and was educated at the Christian Brothers' School in Derry. Ward started his club cricket at Armagh in 1921, before moving to Dublin for his work as a bank official, where he played for Phoenix. He made his debut in first-class cricket for Ireland against the Marylebone Cricket Club at Dublin in 1936, before playing a further first-class match in 1939 against Scotland at College Park, Dublin. Playing as a fast bowler, Ward took 5 wickets across his two matches, averaging 27.80 per wicket. He married Maria Theresa O'Connell in 1936, with the couple having two sons and a daughter. He ended his professional career as a manager for Hibernian Bank. Ward died at Dublin in July 1989.
