= Kilmore, County Armagh =

Village in County Armagh, Northern Ireland

Kilmore: Irish: Cill Mhór
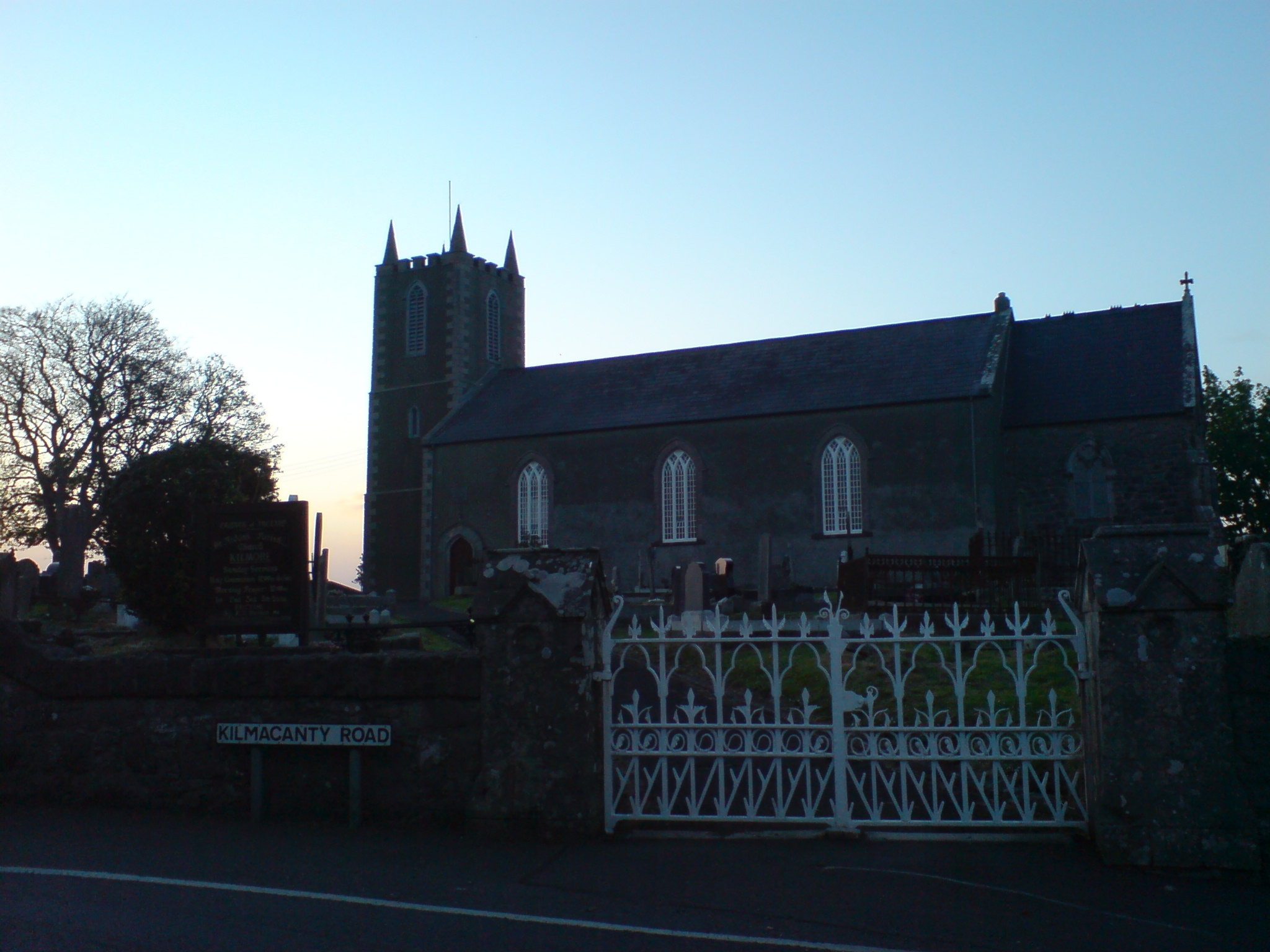
- Kilmore Parish Church

- Location within Northern Ireland
- Population: 190
- Irish grid reference: H 94335 51124
  - Belfast: 28 mi (45 km)
- District: Armagh City, Banbridge and Craigavon
- County: County Armagh
- Country: Northern Ireland
- Sovereign state: United Kingdom
- Post town: Armagh
- Postcode district: BT61
- Dialling code: 028
- Police: Northern Ireland
- Fire: Northern Ireland
- Ambulance: Northern Ireland
- UK Parliament: Newry and Armagh
- NI Assembly: Newry and Armagh

Kilmore or Killmore (from the Irish: Cill Mhór) is a small village, townland and civil parish in County Armagh, Northern Ireland. It lies 2.5 miles (4 km) north of Richhill and within the Armagh City, Banbridge and Craigavon Borough Council area. It had a population of 190 people (74 households) in the 2011 Census.

Finds from the area include a 12th-century silver finger ring, a bone comb, fragments of a lignite bracelet, skeletal remains from fields surrounding the church and an early 10th-century copper alloy and crutch-headed pin now in the British Museum.

== History ==
=== The Troubles ===
For more information see The Troubles in Kilmore, County Armagh, which includes a list of incidents in Kilmore during The Troubles resulting in two or more fatalities.

== People ==
- Thomas Preston, an Irish scientist from the 19th century who published works on heat & light. He also discovered the anomalous Zeeman Effect.

== Sport ==
The nearest GAA club to Kilmore is Ballyhegan Davitts GAC, one of the oldest clubs in County Armagh.

== Education ==
- St. Oliver Plunkett's Primary School

== See also ==
- List of towns and villages in Northern Ireland
- List of civil parishes of County Armagh
