= St Brigid's High School =

Coordinates: 54.348°N 6.661°W

St. Brigid's High School

Location
- Windmill Hill; Armagh, County Armagh, BT60 4BR; Northern Ireland

Information
- Motto: Feabhas a chur ar
- Religious affiliation: Catholic
- Chairman: Patrick Brannigan
- Principal: Paul Carlin
- Staff: 19
- Gender: Male
- Age: 11 to 16
- Enrolment: 210
- Colours: Blue and yellow
- Website: http://www.stbrigids.co.uk

St. Brigid's High School was a secondary school located on the edge of Armagh City, County Armagh, Northern Ireland. The school was founded in 1971 and closed in 2015. It was the only Catholic maintained boys' non-grammar school in Armagh City, with around 210 pupils. The school motto was "Feabhas a chur ar" which means "Try Your Best". The schools senior management team was Acting Principal Mr Paul Carlin, Vice Principal Ms Mary Kelly and Senior Teachers Mr Paul Doyle and Mrs Deirdre Grant.

At the start of the 2015/2016 school year St. Brigid's closed after an amalgamation with St. Patrick's Grammar School Armagh which is planned to undergo an expansion to 1,240 students and a £3 million pound renovation.

It mainly took pupils from the Armagh City and rural area. It lay within the Southern Education and Library Board area.

== Federation with St Patrick's ==
It was announced in January 2011 that a federation working group had been established with St Patrick's Grammar School Armagh. This allowed both schools to work closely and share facilities and resources. In September 2011, New Year 8 students used the new working group. Year 8 students from St Brigid's travelled to St Patrick's for music lessons and Year 8 Students from St Patrick's travelled to St Brigid's for Home Economics lessons, in the school's Home Economics suite.

== Achievements ==
- St Brigid's was the top boy's high school in Northern Ireland in 2007, 2008, 2010 and 2011.
- In 2010 the school had its best ever GCSE results with over 70% of students achieving 5A*-C grades and no one left the school without any GCSE passes.
- St Brigid's was in the topp 50 non-grammar schools in Northern Ireland as quoted in the Irish News.
- In 2006 the school had the top GCSE Applied Art and Design student in the whole of Northern Ireland.
- In 2010 the school had the top GCSE Applied Art and Design student in the whole of Northern Ireland and two students came joint second in GCSE Applied Art and Design student in the whole of Northern Ireland.
- St Brigid's was the Armagh Vocational Schools Gaelic football U16 Champions in 2008/2009, 2010/2011 and 2011/2012 beating schools three and four times the size of them.
- U16 Gaelic football Ulster semi-finalists in 2008/2009.
- U16 Gaelic football Ulster quarter=finalists in 2011/2012.

== Subjects ==
Students at Key Stage Three in St Brigid's were offered subjects including, English, Maths, Science, Religion, Geography, History, Irish, French, Technology and Design, Art and Design, Physical Education, I.C.T., Music, Citizenship, Employability, Home Economics, Personal Health and Social Education. In addition to the subjects above students in Key Stage Four are also offered, Road Traffic Studies, Learning for Work and Life, Applied Art and Design, Double Award Science, Exam P.E., ASDAN and Occupational Studies (VEP).

== Extracurricular ==
St Brigid's extracurricular activities included Gaming Club, skiing lessons, Football Club, Buggy Building, Maths Club, Technology Club, Photography Club, Breakfast Club, Golf Club, Drama Club, Art Club, ICT Club and Homework Club.

St Brigid's won the Armagh Vocational Schools U16 Championship in 2008/2009 and 2010/2011. St Brigid Students fundraised for charities including, Trocaire, Children in Need, St Vincent de Paul, fairtrade and Cash for Clobber. Each year the schooled hosts a Stars in their Eyes production or St Brigid's Talent Show production. Each year the school went on educational visits, past trips have included ski trip to Italy, Celtic trip, Manchester City trip, and fishing trips.
