= William Whitford =

- Born: 1846; Armagh, Ireland
- Died: 15 June 1930; New Brighton, England
- Occupation: Surgeon
- Known for: Everton F.C. director and Chairman
- Spouse: Salome Bithiah Whitford

Dr. William Whitford JP (1846 – 15 June 1930) was a physician who served as chairman of the Everton F.C. and the Everton Liberal Club.

Whitford was born in Armagh, Ireland, and was a physician at Queen's University Belfast. He was an advocate of the Irish home rule movement.

Whitford died at home in New Brighton on 15 June 1930 at the age of 86.
