= John Barnes (Irish cricketer) =

Irish cricketer

Personal information
- Full name: John Hamilton Bryan Barnes
- Born: 14 November 1916; Armagh, Ireland
- Died: 22 April 1943 (aged 26); Kneesall, Nottinghamshire, England
- Batting: Right-handed
- Bowling: Right-arm fast
- Relatives: Robert Barnes (brother)

Domestic team information
- Years: Team
- 1937: Ireland

Career statistics
Competition	First-class
Matches	1
Runs scored	0
Batting average	0.00
100s/50s	–/–
Top score	0
Balls bowled	48
Wickets	1
Bowling average	9.00
5 wickets in innings	–
10 wickets in match	–
Best bowling	1/2
Catches/stumpings	–/–
- Source: Cricinfo, 2 January 2022

John Hamilton Barnes (14 November 1916 in Armagh, Ireland – 22 April 1943 in Nottinghamshire, England) was an Irish cricketer. He was a right-handed batsman and a right-arm fast bowler who played twice for Ireland against New Zealand in September 1937. The first of those two matches had first-class status.
