= City of Armagh High School =

Controlled school in Armagh, Northern Ireland

Coordinates: 54.357°N 6.652°W

Location
- Alexander Road; Armagh, County Armagh, BT61 7JH; Northern Ireland

Information
- Type: Controlled
- Local authority: Education Authority
- Chair: William Scott
- Principal: Karen Mulholland
- Age: 11 to 18
- Enrolment: 350
- Colours: Maroon and White
- Website: https://www.cityofarmagh.org/

The City of Armagh High School (formerly Armagh Secondary School) is located in the city of Armagh, Northern Ireland. It is one of six schools in the Armagh City. The school moved to a new location in 1995 and was opened by Queen Elizabeth II.

The City of Armagh High School teaches children aged 11–18. The school opened in 1965. The school's slogan is "Excellence, Opportunity and Care".

The City of Armagh High School has sports such as football, hockey, netball, athletics, gymnastics and cross country. The school choir performs a Christmas choir service. The school's uniform is maroon and white.

== Sources ==
- City of Armagh High School official website
