= Southern Regional College =

Further and higher education college in Northern Ireland

Coordinates: 54.352°N 6.653°W

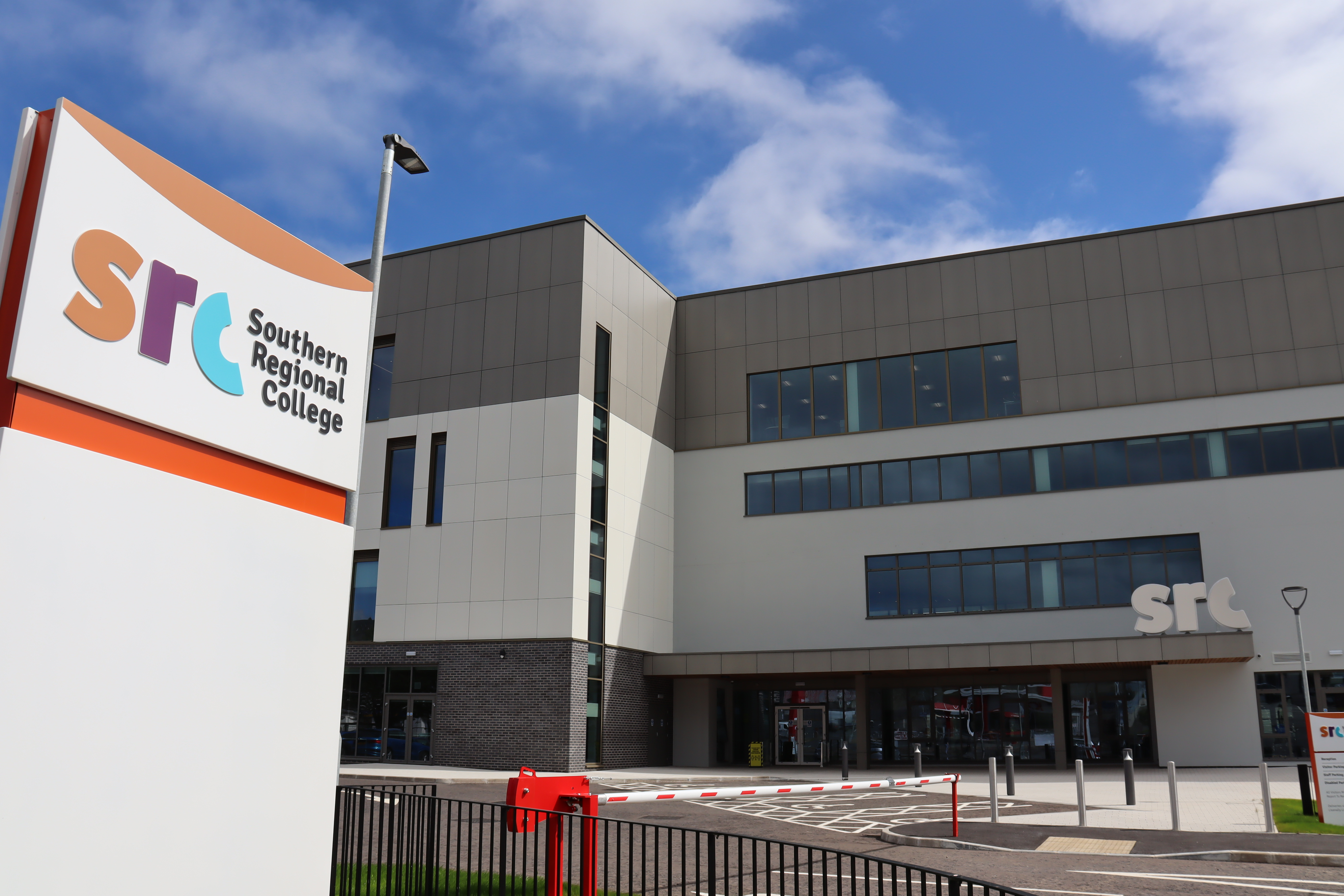
- SRC Armagh Campus
- Established: 2007
- Faculty: 900
- Students: 10,000 annually
- Location: Northern Ireland
- Campus: Multiple sites
- Website: www.src.ac.uk
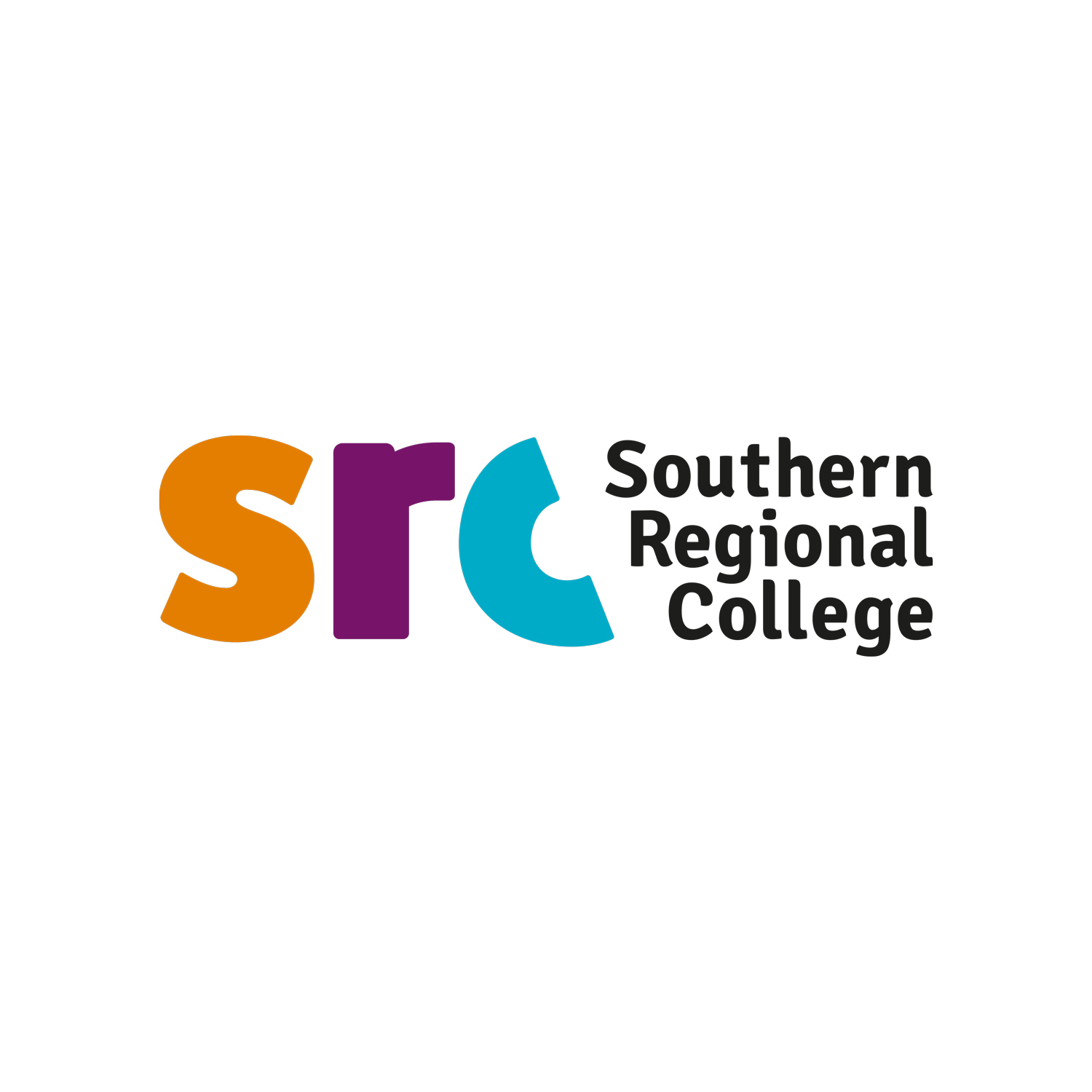

Southern Regional College (SRC) is a further and higher education college in the southern area of Northern Ireland in the United Kingdom. It was formed in 2007 following a merger of the Further Education colleges of Armagh College, Newry and Kilkeel Institute, and the Upper Bann Institute. The College has a total of 5 campuses incorporating the two council areas of Armagh, Banbridge and Craigavon and Newry, Mourne and Down.

At further education level, the College offers Level 2 Traineeships, Level 2 and 3 Apprenticeships, Level 2 and 3 Diplomas, Certificates and Extended Diplomas and A-Levels. At higher education, courses offered include HNCs/HNDs, Foundation Degrees, Degrees and Higher Level Apprenticeships. Courses can be either full, part-time or flexible study via eLearning.

As of 2024, SRC catered for approximately 10,000 students and had in excess of 900 members of staff.

== Campuses ==
The college's main campuses locations are:

- Armagh
- Banbridge
- Lurgan
- Newry
- Portadown

== Courses, students and faculty ==
The College offers a vast range of courses in most subject areas aimed at those leaving school post GCSE & A-Level and for adult returners wishing to undertake higher education or part-time study at any level. Courses are offered under four Faculty areas: Faculty of Building Technology & Engineering; Faculty of Computing, Design & Academic Studies; Faculty of Health & Science; and Faculty of Professional Studies.

== Student Societies ==
Student Societies in the SRC are managed and controlled by the Students Union. All societies are open to SRC students no matter what course they are doing.

The current list of Societies are

- The Debate and Historical Society
- Dungeons and Dragons Club
- Movie Club
- Games Club
- Women's Society
- Sustainability Society
- LGBTQ+ Society
- Cultural Diversity Council
- Entrepreneurship Club
- Mature Students Society
