= The Mall, Armagh =

Cricket ground in Northern Ireland

The Mall
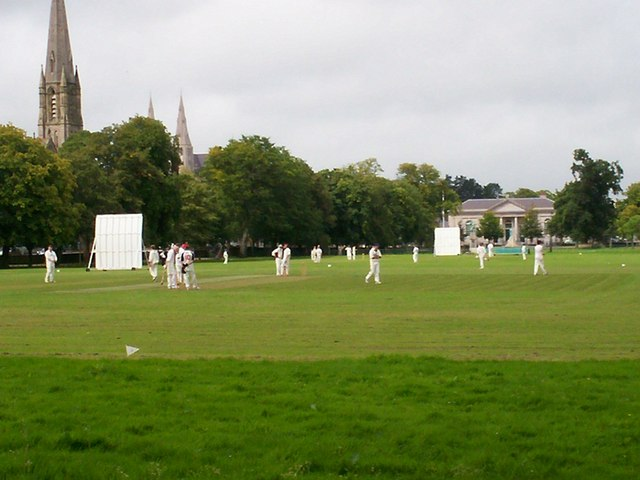
- Interactive map of The Mall

Ground information
- Location: Armagh, Northern Ireland
- Country: Ireland
- Coordinates: 54.3483°N 6.6501°W
- End names
- City End; Dundonald End

Team information
Armagh Cricket Club	(1861–present)

The Mall is a cricket ground in Armagh, Northern Ireland. It has been used to host inter-club cricket matches since at least the 1840s, and has hosted a number of international cricket matches.

== Club cricket ==
The Mall was used to host club cricket matches in the 1840s, and has been used for home matches by Armagh Cricket Club since the 1860s. Founded in 1859, the club originally played on other pitches, before obtaining a lease for use of The Mall in 1861. Armagh Cricket Club built a number of pavilions at the ground, with the current building dating to the 1990s.

== International cricket ==
In 2005, the ground hosted a List A match in the 2005 International Cricket Council Trophy between Denmark and the United States, which Denmark won by 96 runs. It had previously hosted a European Cricket Championship match, in July 2002, between Germany and Israel.
