= Armagh =

City in Northern Ireland

Coordinates: 54.3499°N 6.6546°W

Armagh: Irish: Ard Mhacha; Scots: Airmagh
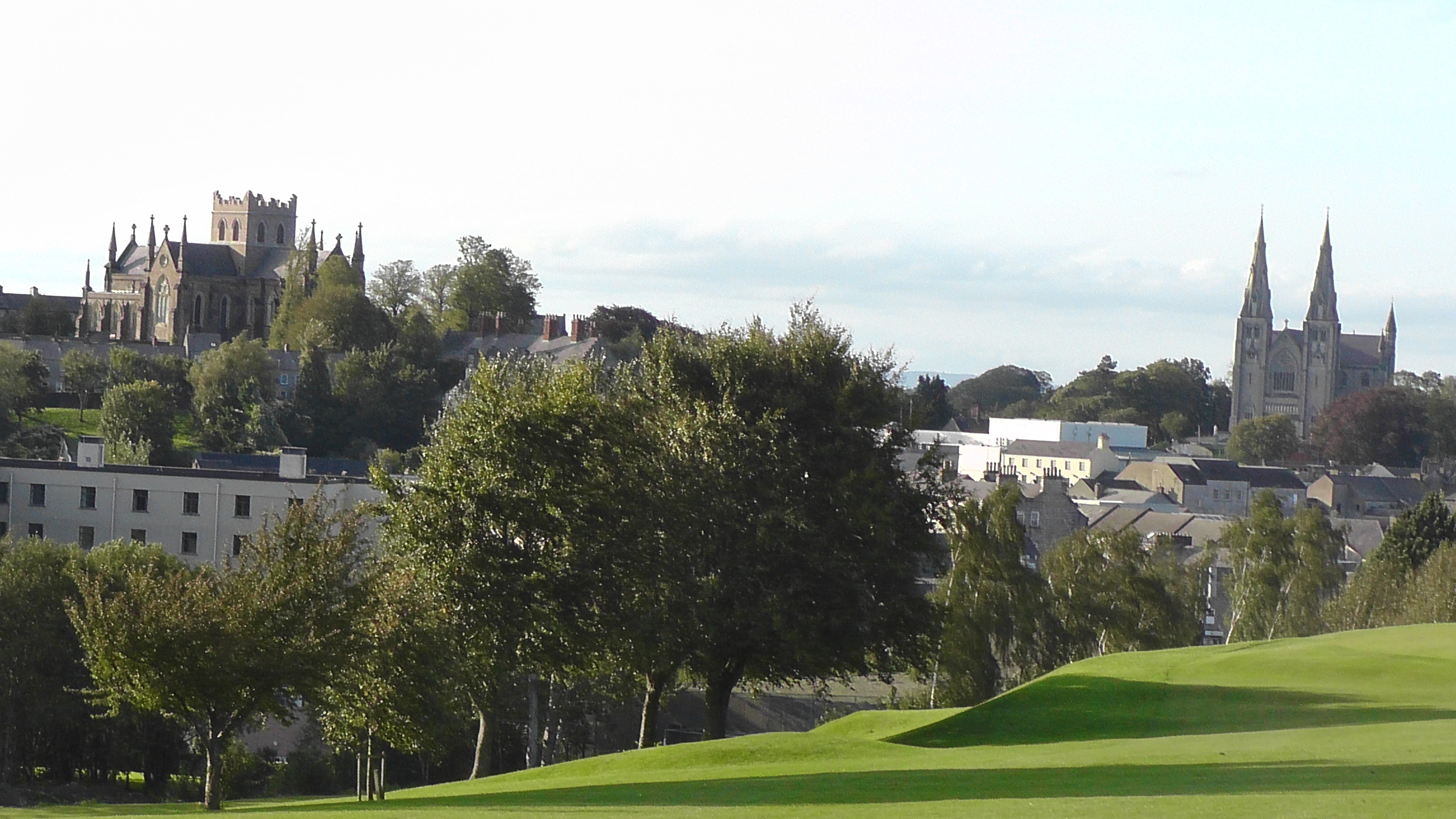
- The two St Patrick's cathedrals, Armagh

- Coat of Arms

- Location within Northern Ireland
- Population: 16,310 (2021 Census)
- Irish grid reference: H876455
  - Belfast: 33 mi (53 km)
- District: Armagh City, Banbridge and Craigavon
- County: County Armagh
- Country: Northern Ireland
- Sovereign state: United Kingdom
- Post town: ARMAGH
- Postcode district: BT60, BT61
- Dialling code: 028
- UK Parliament: Newry and Armagh
- NI Assembly: Newry and Armagh
- Website: armagh.gov.uk

Armagh (/ɑːrˈmɑː/ ar-MAH; Irish: Ard Mhacha, IPA: [ˌaːɾˠd̪ˠ ˈwaxə], "Macha's height") is a city and the county town of County Armagh, in Northern Ireland, as well as a civil parish. It is the ecclesiastical capital of Ireland – the seat of the Archbishops of Armagh, the Primates of All Ireland for both the Roman Catholic Church and the Church of Ireland. In ancient times, nearby Navan Fort (Eamhain Mhacha) was a pagan ceremonial site and one of the great royal capitals of Gaelic Ireland. Today, Armagh is home to two cathedrals (both named after Saint Patrick) and the Armagh Observatory, and is known for its Georgian architecture.

Statistically classed as a medium-sized town by the Northern Ireland Statistics and Research Agency, Armagh was given city status in 1994 and Lord Mayoralty status in 2012. It had a population of 16,310 people in the 2021 Census.

== History ==
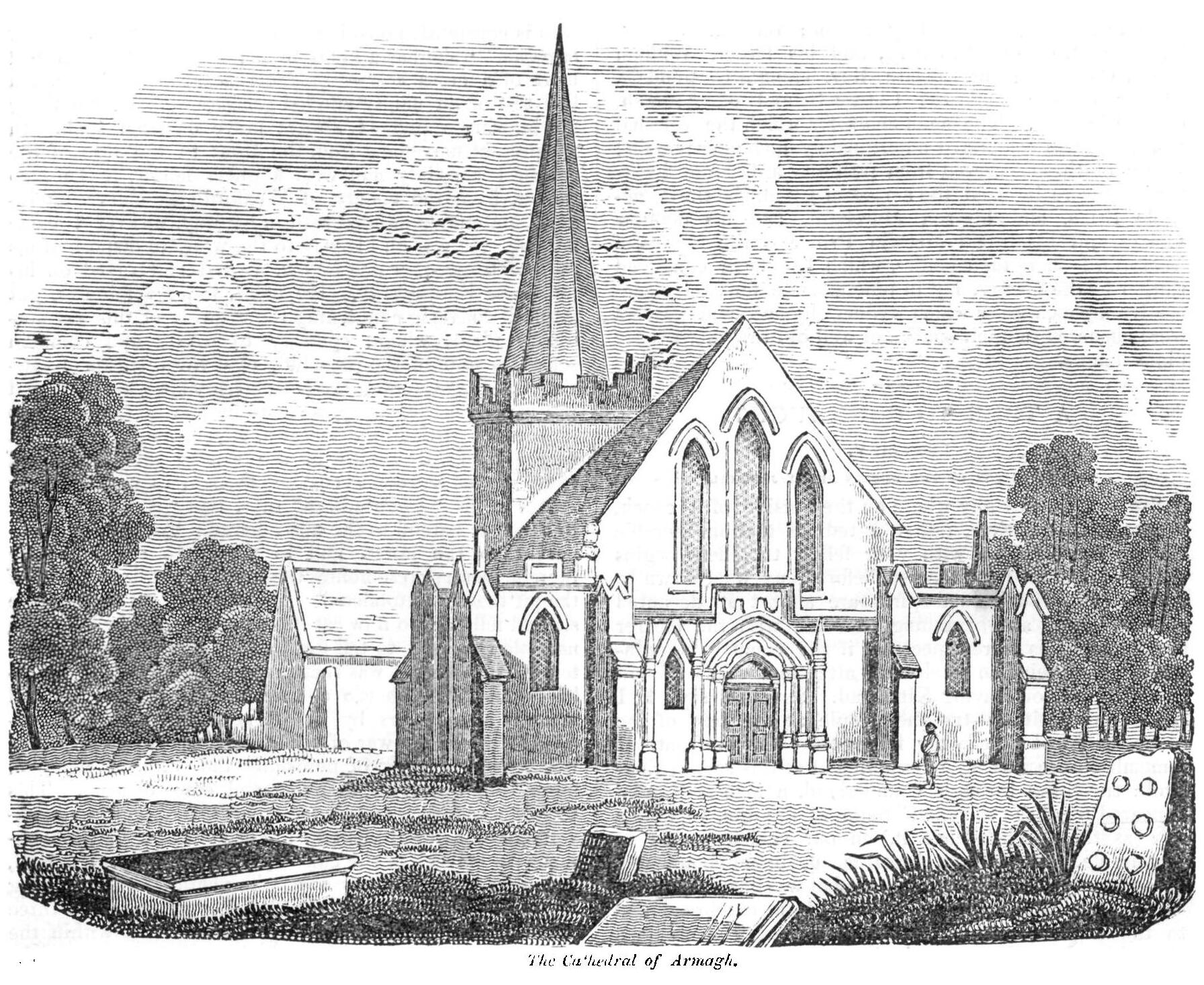
St. Patrick's Cathedral, Armagh (Church of Ireland), in 1832, built on the site of the original church

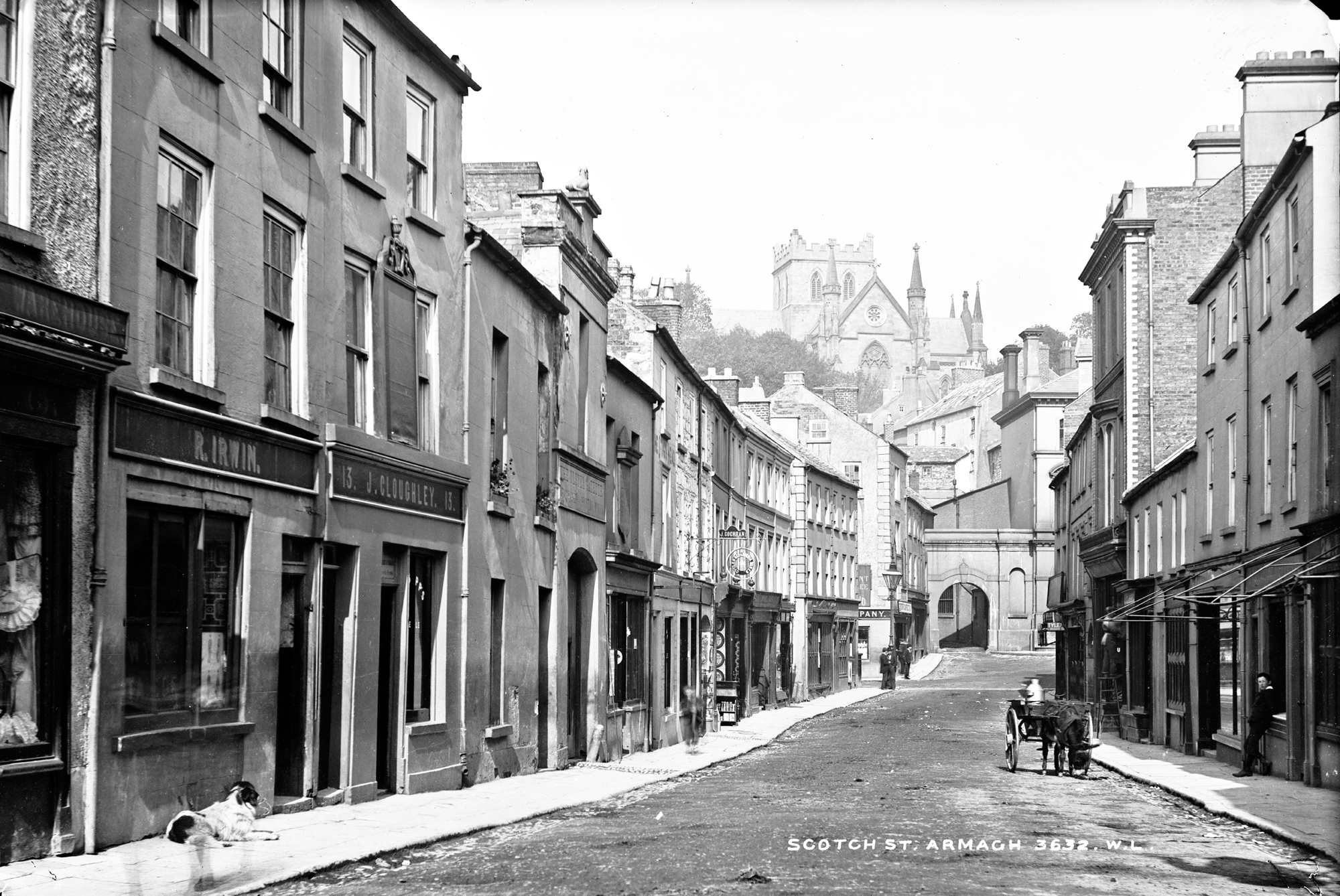
Scotch Street, c. 1900

=== Foundation ===
Eamhain Mhacha (or Navan Fort), at the western edge of Armagh, was an ancient pagan ritual or ceremonial site. According to Irish mythology it was one of the great royal sites of Gaelic Ireland and the capital of Ulster. It appears to have been largely abandoned after the 1st century. In the 3rd century, a ditch and bank was dug around the top of Cathedral Hill, the heart of what is now Armagh. Its circular shape matches the modern street layout. Evidence suggests that it was a pagan sanctuary and the successor to Navan. Like Navan, it too was named after the goddess Macha: Ard Mhacha, meaning "Macha's height". This name was later anglicised as Ardmagh, which eventually became Armagh. Navan and Armagh were linked by an ancient road which passes over Mullacreevie hill.

After Christianity spread to Ireland, the pagan sanctuary was converted into a Christian one, and Armagh became the site of an important church and monastery. According to tradition, Saint Patrick founded his main church there in the year 445, and it eventually became the head church of Ireland. Muirchú writes that a pagan chieftain named Dáire would not let Patrick build a church on the hill of Ard Mhacha, but instead gave him lower ground to the east. One day, Dáire's horses died after grazing on the church land. He told his men to kill Patrick, but was himself struck down with illness. They begged Patrick to heal him, and Patrick's holy water revived both Dáire and his horses. Dáire rewarded Patrick with a great bronze cauldron and gave him the hill of Ard Mhacha to build a church. Dáire has similarities with the Irish god the Dagda.

=== Medieval era ===
By the 7th century, Armagh had become the site of the most important church, monastery and monastic school in the north of Ireland. The Book of Armagh was produced in the monastery in the early 9th century and contains some of the oldest surviving specimens of Old Irish.

Armagh was at the heart of the kingdom of the Airthir, a part of the Airgíalla federation. The church at Armagh looked to both the Airthir and neighbouring Uí Néill for patronage. The Uí Néill High King, Niall Caille (Niall of the Callan), was buried at Armagh in 846 after drowning in the River Callan. His son, High King Áed Findliath, had a house at Armagh.

The first Viking raids on Armagh were recorded in 832, with three in one month, and it suffered at least ten Viking raids over the following century. A hoard seemingly lost by Vikings in the River Blackwater shows the high quality of metalwork being made in Armagh at this time.

Brian Boru, High King of Ireland, visited Armagh in 1004, acknowledging it as the head church of Ireland and bestowing it a large sum of gold. Brian was buried at Armagh cathedral after his death at the Battle of Clontarf in 1014. Armagh's claim to being the head church of Ireland was formally acknowledged at the Synod of Ráth Breasail in 1111. The 1171 Council of Armagh freed all Englishmen and women who were enslaved in Ireland.

Following the Anglo-Norman invasion of Ireland, Armagh was attacked by Anglo-Normans led by Philip de Worcester in 1185 and by John de Courcy in 1189. It was also raided by Ruaidrí mac Duinn Sléibe of Ulaid in 1196 and 1199.

Archbishop Máel Patraic Ua Scannail rebuilt Armagh cathedral in 1268 and founded a Franciscan friary, whose remains can still be seen. There was also a small Culdee community in Armagh until the 16th century.

=== Early modern era ===
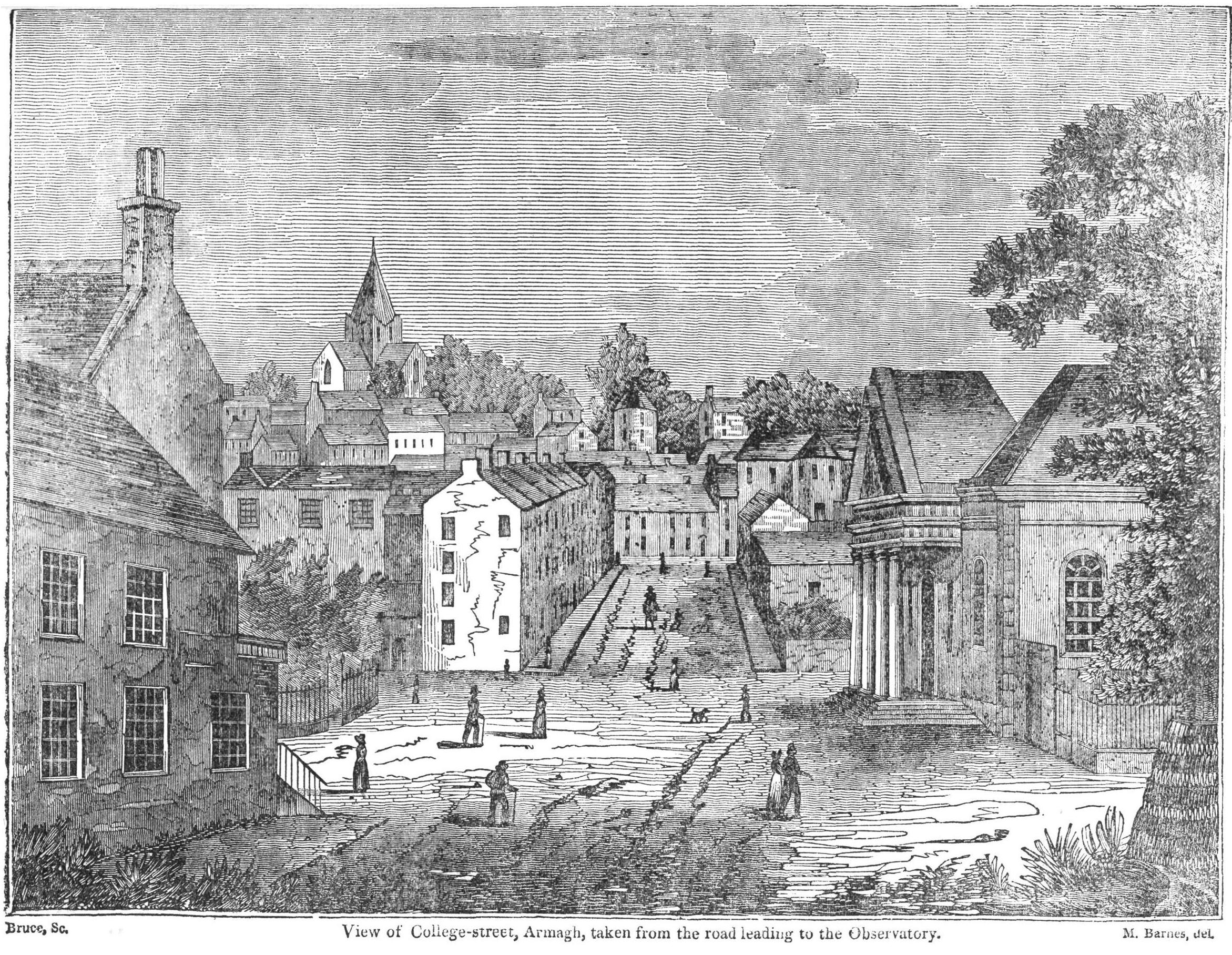
A view of College Street in 1835, from the Dublin Penny Journal

During the 16th century Tudor conquest of Ireland, Armagh suffered greatly in the conflict between the English and the O'Neills. Armagh was strategically important as it lay between the English Pale and the O'Neill heartland of Tyrone, and the town changed hands many times during the wars. In the 1560s, English troops under Thomas Radclyffe occupied and fortified the town, which was then attacked and largely destroyed by Shane O'Neill. After the Battle of the Yellow Ford in 1598, the routed English army took refuge at Armagh before surrendering to Hugh O'Neill. By the end of the Nine Years' War, Armagh lay in ruins, as shown on Richard Bartlett's 1601 map.

Following the Nine Years' War, Armagh came under English dominance and the cathedral came under the control of the Protestant Church of Ireland. The cathedral was rebuilt under Archbishop Christopher Hampton and the town began to be settled by Protestants from Britain, as part of the Plantation of Ulster. During the Irish Rebellion of 1641, many British settlers fled to Armagh cathedral for safety. After negotiations with the besieged settlers, Catholic rebels under Felim O'Neill occupied the town. In May 1642, following several rebel defeats and massacres by settlers elsewhere, the rebels in Armagh seized the settlers' property and set fire to the town.

=== Modern era ===
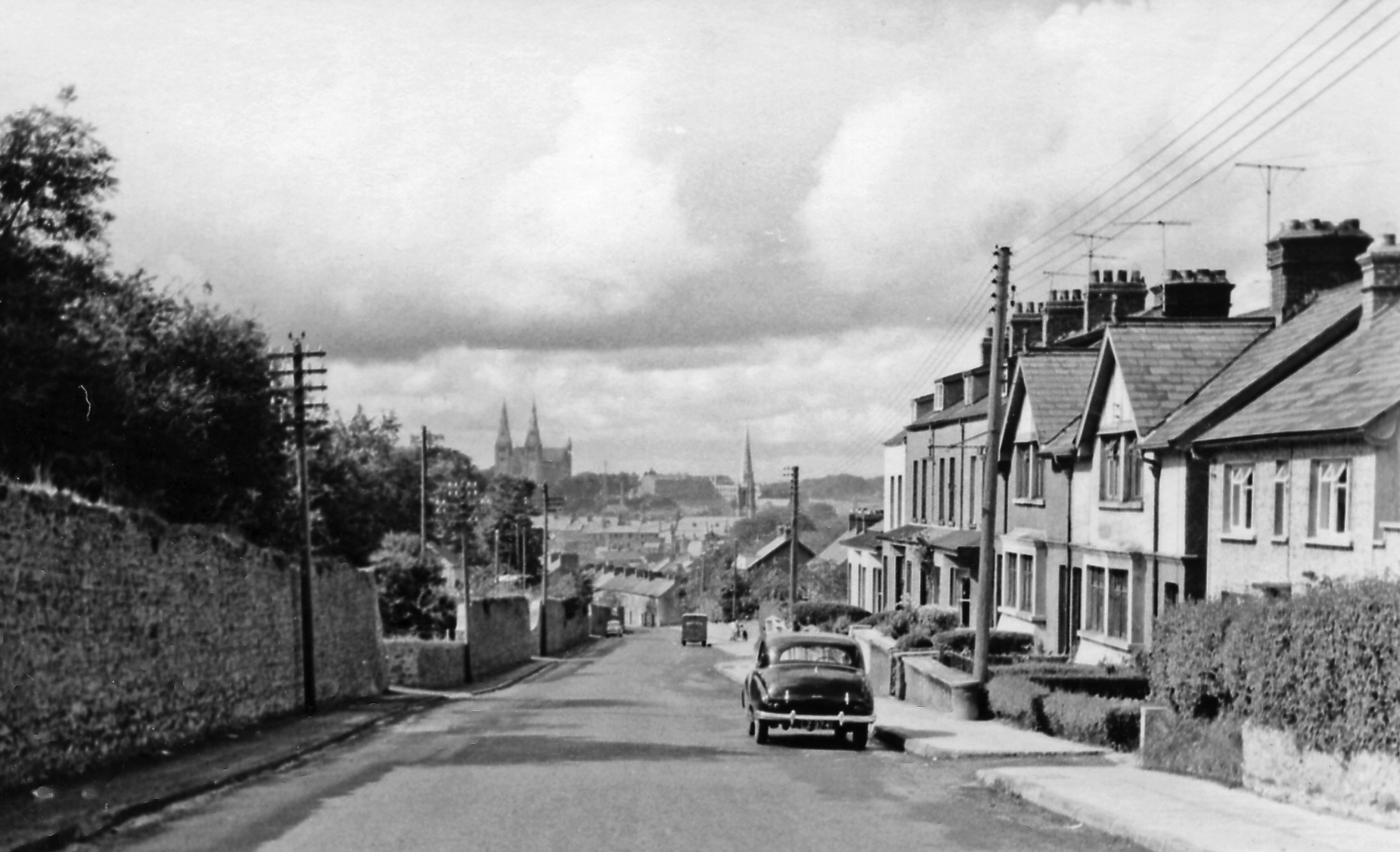
Armagh from the Newry Road, 1960

The parliamentary borough of Armagh was a two-seat constituency in the Irish House of Commons prior to 1801. It continued as a one-seat constituency in the United Kingdom House of Commons from 1801 to 1885. It had a municipal corporation which was abolished under the Municipal Corporations (Ireland) Act 1840.

Armagh has been an educational centre since the time of Saint Patrick, and thus it has been referred to as "the city of saints and scholars". The educational tradition continued with the foundation of the Royal School in 1608, St Patrick's College in 1834 and the Armagh Observatory in 1790. The Observatory was part of Archbishop Lord Rokeby's plan to have a university in the city. This ambition was finally fulfilled, albeit briefly, in the 1990s when Queen's University of Belfast opened an outreach centre in the former hospital building.

The Catch-my-Pal Protestant Total Abstinence Union was founded in 1909 in Armagh by the minister of 3rd Armagh (now The Mall) Presbyterian Church, Rev. Robert Patterson. Although relatively short-lived it was very successful for that time, attracting many tens of thousands of members. It was influential in the development of a "two-community" narrative in Ulster which was important in the Ulster Unionist campaign during the Home Rule crisis. A blue plaque historical marker commemorating Rev. Patterson was erected on The Mall in 2019.

Three brothers from Armagh died at the Battle of the Somme during World War I. None of the three has a known grave and all are commemorated on the Thiepval Memorial to the Missing of the Somme. A fourth brother was wounded in the same attack.

On 14 January 1921, during the Irish War of Independence, a Royal Irish Constabulary (RIC) sergeant was assassinated by the Irish Republican Army (IRA) in Armagh. He was attacked with a grenade as he walked along Market Street and later died of his wounds. On 4 September 1921, republican leaders Michael Collins and Eoin O'Duffy addressed a large meeting in Armagh, which was attended by up to 10,000 people.

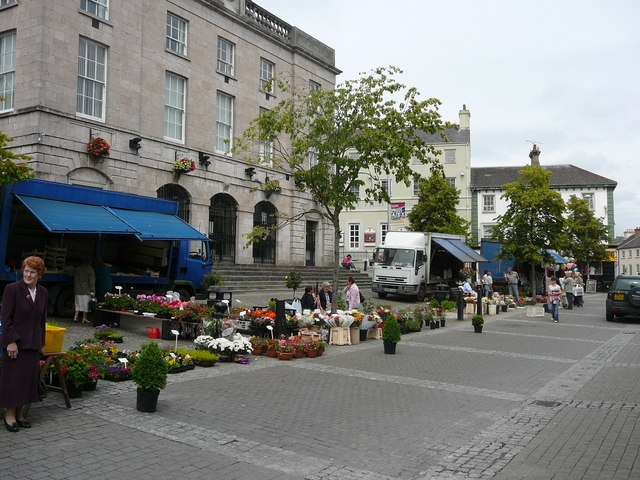
Open-air market on Market Street

During the Troubles in Armagh, the violence was substantial enough for a stretch of road on the outskirts of the city to be referred to as "Murder Mile". Over the span of 36 years, although mainly concentrated in the years from 1969 until 1994, the small city, including some outlying areas, saw 86 deaths in the Troubles, including those of a number of people from the city who died elsewhere in Troubles-related incidents. Armagh City Hall, which had been built as the Tontine Buildings in 1828 and converted into a municipal building in 1910, was badly damaged in a bomb attack on 27 September 1972 and subsequently demolished.

== City status ==
As the seat of the Primate of All Ireland, Armagh was historically regarded as a city, and recognisably had the status by 1226. It had no charter granted but claimed the title by prescription, and was later formerly chartered as a borough in 1613 under James I; Acts of the Parliament of Ireland in 1773 and 1791 refer to the "City of Armagh". Armagh lost the status with the abolition of its city corporation by the Municipal Corporations (Ireland) Act 1840 after it was deemed ineffective and unrepresentative of its population. From 1953, Armagh began to argue for the restoration of the status lost in 1840, with several applications to the Home Office being made.

The council used the appellation "city" unofficially until 1994 when, at Queen Elizabeth II's personal request, Armagh along with the Welsh town of St Davids was awarded the status. Charles, Prince of Wales during a visit in July 1994 announced it had been granted to mark the 1,550th anniversary of the traditional date of Armagh's foundation by Saint Patrick, and also "in recognition of [Armagh's and St Davids'] important Christian heritage and their status as cities in the last century".

The award of city status is typically granted to a local authority body, and the letters patent was initially presented to dignitaries and Armagh District Council by Queen Elizabeth during a visit on 9 March 1995. Following this, it was renamed Armagh City and District Council from 1 October 1995. Armagh City, Banbridge and Craigavon Borough Council presently holds the status on behalf of the city as there is no localised council body since the aforementioned districts were merged in 2015 as a result of local government reform. Armagh contains the lowest population of all the cities of Northern Ireland, and is sixth physically smallest in the UK. Its urban area, covering 3.97 sq mi (10.3 km^{2}), makes it the smallest city by size in Northern Ireland, however several other cities are smaller when the UK is taken as a whole.

== Notable buildings ==
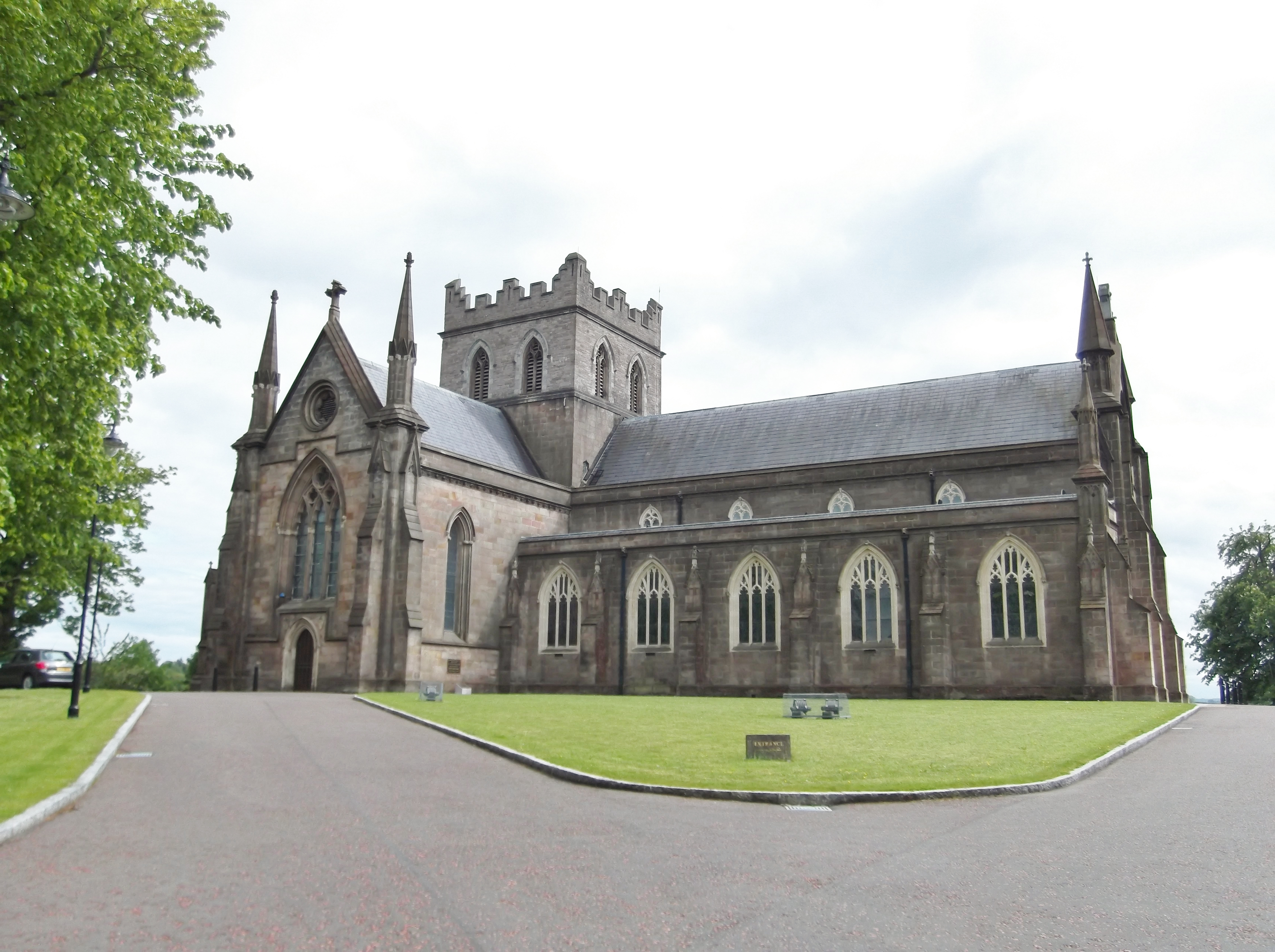
St. Patrick's Cathedral, Armagh (Church of Ireland)

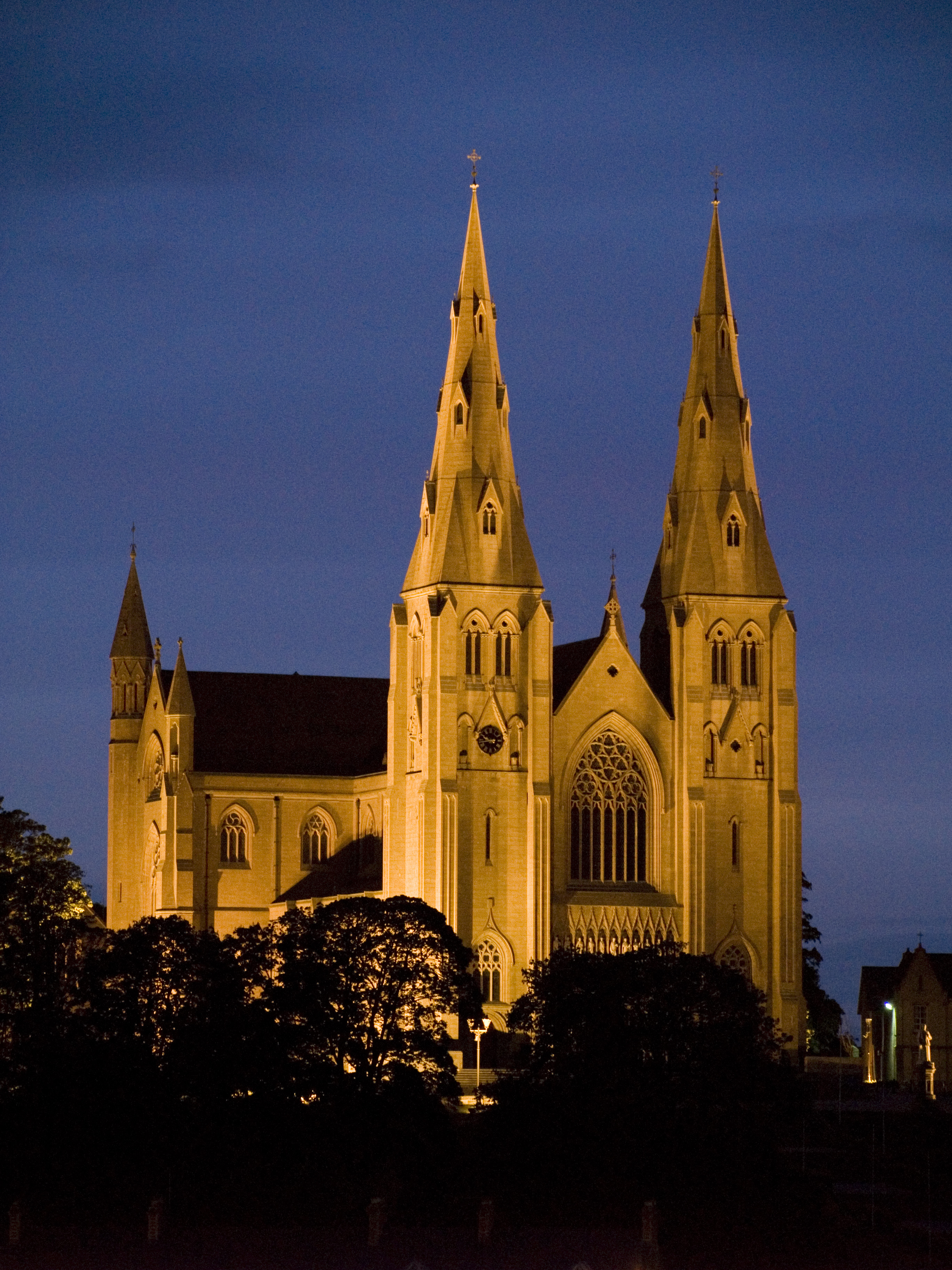
St. Patrick's Cathedral, Armagh (Roman Catholic)

Armagh is the site of two cathedrals, both on hills and both named after Saint Patrick. The Church of Ireland cathedral dates back to around 445. The present-day, post-Reformation, Roman Catholic cathedral was constructed during the latter half of the 19th century and features twin 64 m (210 ft) spires, making it the tallest such structure in the county. Armagh is one of the few cities in the world that is home to two cathedrals of the same name.

Armagh has a Georgian area of heritage importance. Perhaps one of the more well known of the buildings is the former women's prison. The construction of Armagh Gaol began in 1780 and was extended in the 1840s and 1850s. The front façade of the prison was built in the Georgian style, while the later development, based on the design of Pentonville (HM Prison), is Victorian. For most of its working life it was a women's prison although not exclusively so. Armagh Gaol was the primary women's prison in Northern Ireland. In 1986 the prison closed and its prisoners were transferred to the new prison at Maghaberry.

The city is home to the Armagh Observatory, founded in 1790, and to the Armagh Planetarium, established in 1968 to complement the research work of the Observatory. The palace of the Archbishop of Armagh is now the local council offices and, along with the archbishop's private chapel, is open to the public. The Palace Stables heritage centre is a reconstructed stable block dating from the 18th century, which was once part of the Archbishop's estate.

Among the city's chief glories is Armagh Public Library on Abbey Street. It was founded in 1771 by Archbishop Richard Robinson (who was created the first Baron Rokeby in 1777), using his own library as its nucleus. It is especially rich in 17th- and 18th-century books in English, including Dean Jonathan Swift's own copy of the first edition of his Gulliver's Travels with his manuscript corrections.

Armagh Market House was built in 1815 as a two-storey five-bay building, and is currently used as a library.

Armagh County Museum is the oldest county museum in Ireland. The building dates from 1833 and was originally a school house. It was opened as the County Museum in 1937.

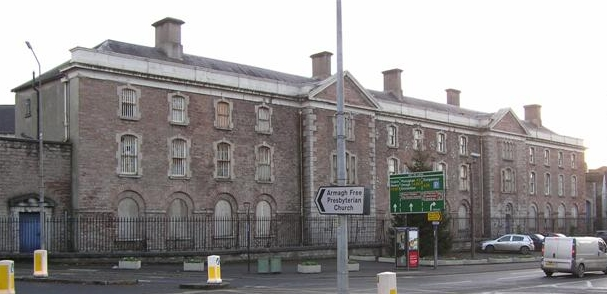
Armagh Prison

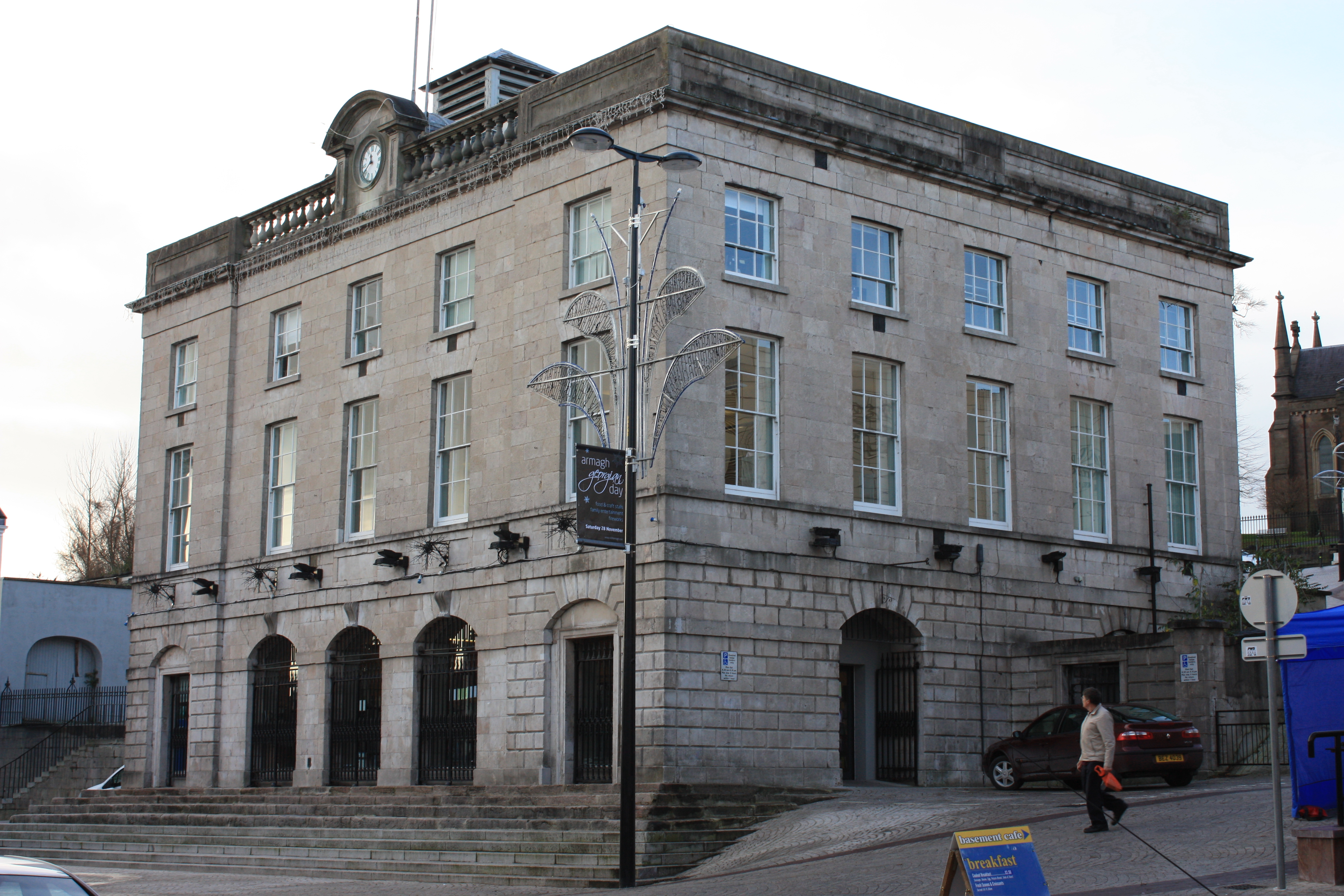
Market House

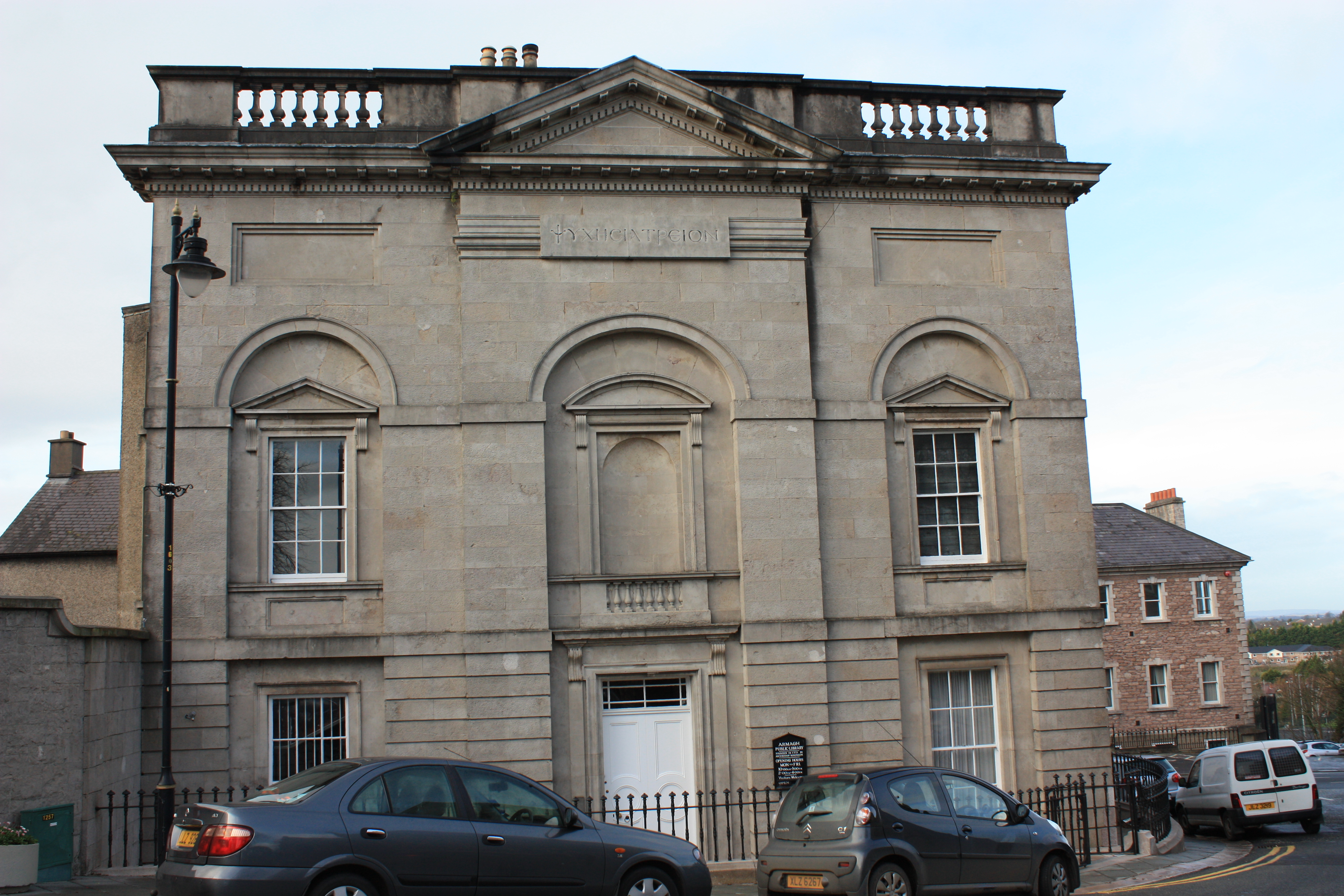
Armagh Public Library

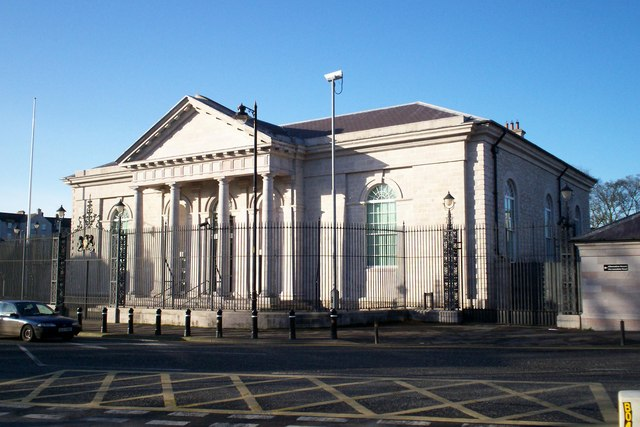
Courthouse

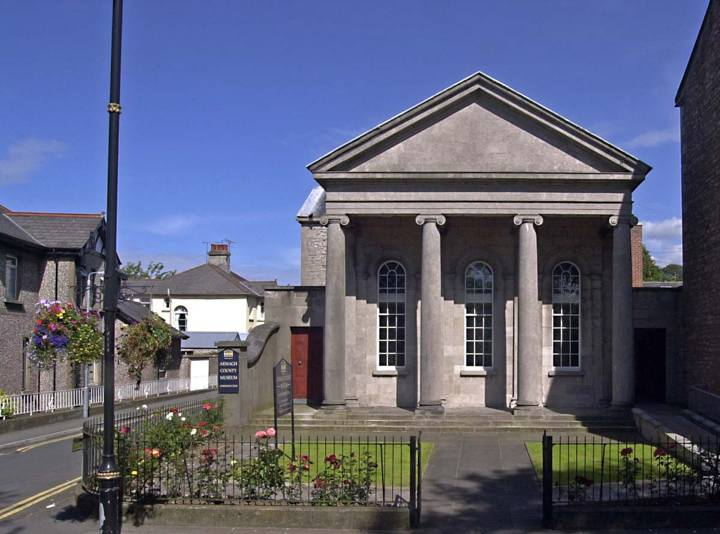
Armagh County Museum

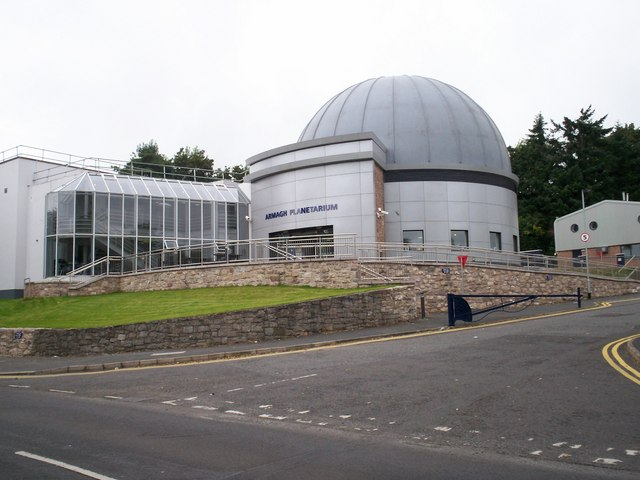
Armagh Planetarium

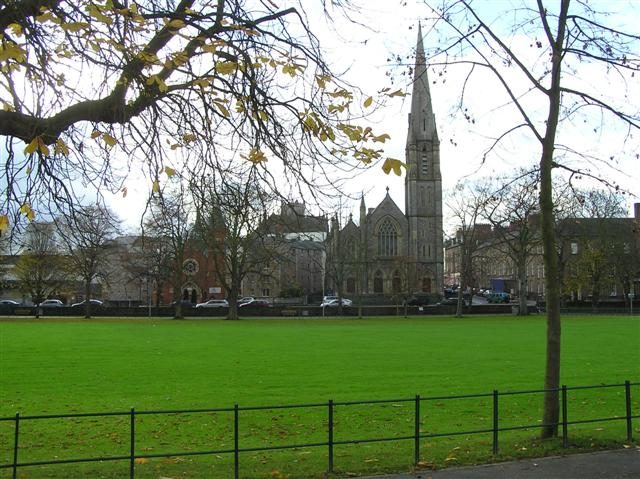
The Mall, looking toward the First Presbyterian Church and Gospel Hall

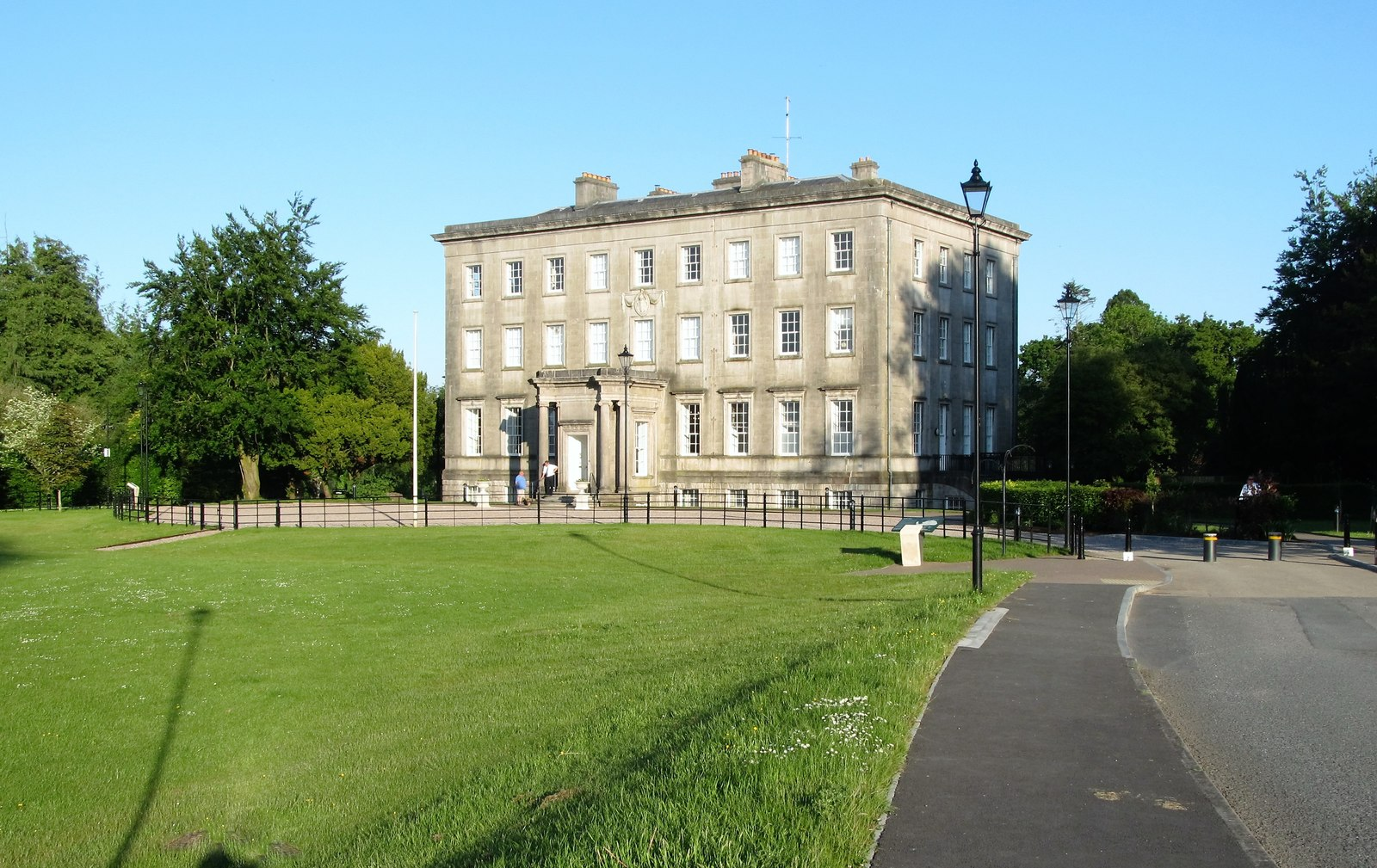
Archbishop's Palace

== Townlands ==
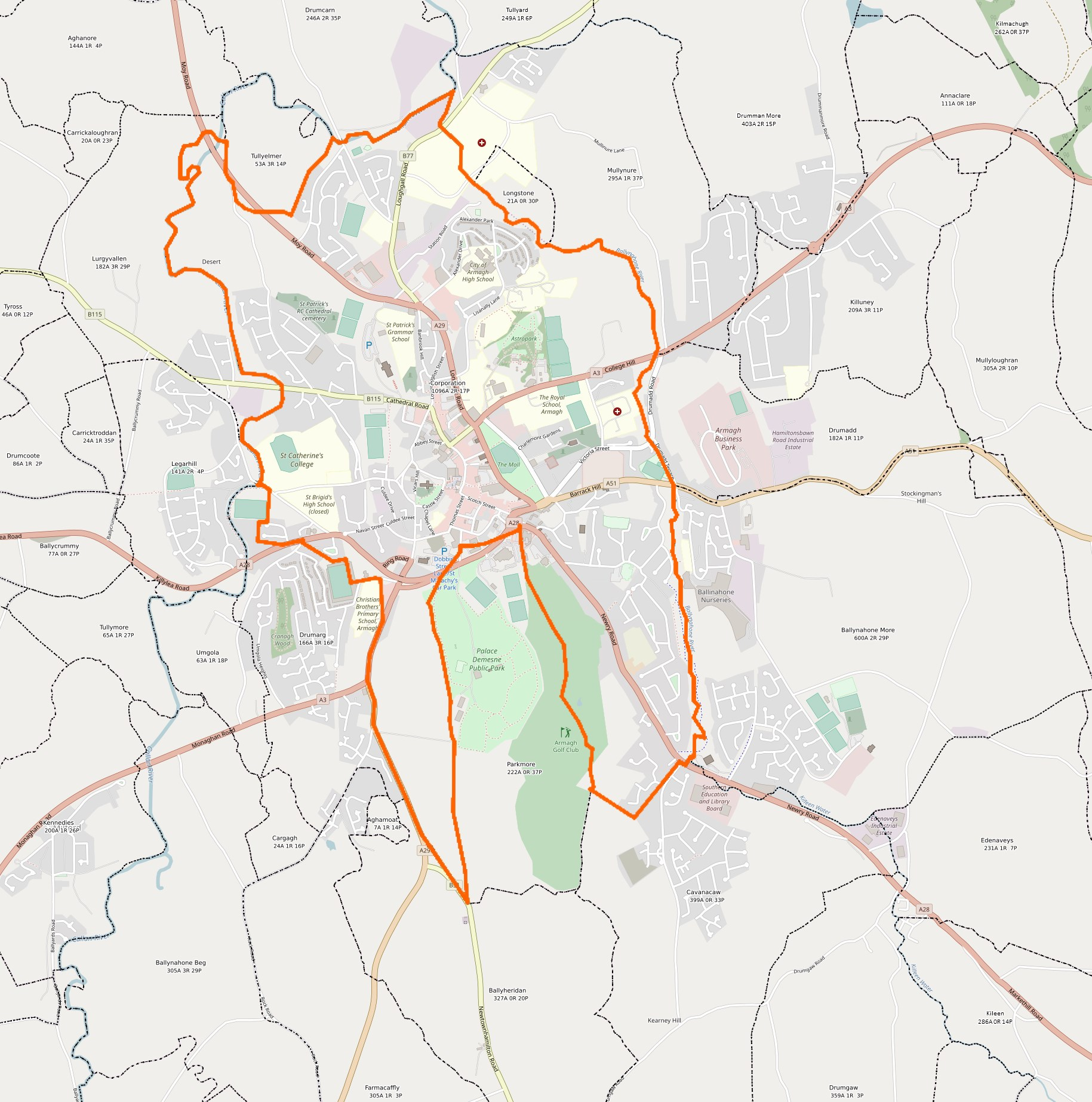
Armagh showing townlands Corporation townland Other townlands Built-up area Countryside Greenfield land

Armagh is within the civil parish of Armagh. Like the rest of Ireland, this parish is divided into townlands, whose names mostly come from the Irish language. When these townlands were built upon, they lent their names to various streets, roads and housing estates. In 1830, most of Armagh's urban townlands were amalgamated for administration and became known as Corporation Lands or simply Corporation. The surrounding townlands remained as separate units and they were eventually built upon too. They are listed below alongside their likely etymologies.

- Aghamoat (from Irish Achadh Mochta 'Mochta's field')
- Ballynahone More (from Baile na hAbhann, "townland of the river")
- Cargagh (from Cairgeach, "rocky land")
- Cavanacaw (from Cabhán an Chatha, "hollow of the battle" or Cabhán na Cáithe, "hollow of the chaff")
- Drumadd (formerly Drumadokeenan, from Dromad Uí Chianáin, "O'Keenan's ridge")
- Drumarg (from Droim Mairge, "ridge of the boundary")
- Drumman More (from Dromann, "the ridge")
- Killuney (from Cill Liamhna, "Liamhain's church")
- Legarhill or Mullaghcreevie (from Mullach Craoibhe, "hilltop of the branch"; legar is from an old English word for a military camp)
- Longstone (named after a standing stone)
- Lurgyvallen (from Lorga Uí Mhealláin, "O'Mallon's long low ridge")
- Mullynure (from Mullach an Iúir, "hilltop of the yew") – part of Grange parish
- Parkmore (from Páirc Mhór, "great field")
- Tullyelmer (originally Tullyelmaine, possibly from Tulaigh Alúine, "hillock of the yellow clay")
- Umgola (from Iomghuala, "hill-shoulder")

Some of the former townlands included:

- Doonullagh (possibly from Dún Ulaidhe, "fort of the tomb")
- Drumbreda (from Droim Brighde, "Brigid's hill")
- Knockadrain (from Cnoc an Droighin, "blackthorn hill") – site of the Catholic cathedral
- Knockamell (from Cnoc Uí Ághmaill, "O'Hamill's hill") – site of the Observatory
- Knockenboy (from Cnocán Buidhe, "yellow hillock")
- Lisanally (formerly Liosconalia, from Lios Chon Allaidh meaning "fort of the wolf"; "Cú Allaidh's fort")
- Tullynalecky (from Tulaigh na Leice, "flagstone hill") – site of St Patrick's Catholic graveyard
- Templebreed (from Teampall Brighde, "Brigid's chapel")
- Templefertagh (from Teampall Fearta, "chapel of the graves or miracles")
- Tullyasnagh

== Demography ==
National Identity of Armagh residents (2021)
Nationality	Per cent
Irish	47.9%
Northern Irish	24.1%
British	20.2%

=== 2021 Census ===
On Census day (21 March 2021) there were 16,310 people living in Armagh. Of these:

- 22.36% were aged under 16, 62.11% were aged between 16 and 65, and 15.52% were aged 66 or over.
- 51.91% of the usually resident population were female and 48.09% were male.
- 67.3% (10,977) belong to or were brought up Catholic, 23.76% (3,875) belong to or were brought up 'Protestant and Other Christian (including Christian related)', 1.35% belong to other religions and 7.59% have no religious background.
- 47.93% had an Irish national identity, 20.17% indicated that they had a British national identity, 24.08% had a Northern Irish national identity, and 16.27% had an 'other' national identity. (respondents could indicate more than one national identity).
- 21.67% had some knowledge of Irish (Gaeilge) and 5.35% had some knowledge of Ulster Scots.

=== 2011 Census ===
On Census day (27 March 2011) there were 14,777 people living in Armagh (5871 households), accounting for 0.82% of the NI total, representing an increase of 1.3% on the Census 2001 population of 14,590. Of these:

- 20.90% were aged under 16 years and 15.44% were aged 65 and over.
- 52.52% of the usually resident population were female and 47.48% were male.
- 68.85% belong to or were brought up in the Catholic Christian faith and 26.95% belong to or were brought up in a 'Protestant and Other Christian (including Christian related)' religion.
- 44.39% had an Irish national identity, 27.18% indicated that they had a British national identity and 26.43% had a Northern Irish national identity (respondents could indicate more than one national identity).
- 37 years was the average (median) age of the population;
- 18.76% had some knowledge of Irish (Gaeilge) and 4.08% had some knowledge of Ulster-Scots.

== Governance ==
Armagh City and District Council was a single district council until 2015 when it merged with Banbridge District Council and Craigavon Borough Council under local government reorganisation in Northern Ireland to become Armagh City, Banbridge and Craigavon Borough Council, sometimes colloquially referred to as the ABC council.

Armagh is part of the Newry and Armagh constituency for elections to the Northern Ireland Assembly. Together with part of the district of Newry and Mourne, it forms the Newry and Armagh constituency for elections to the Westminster Parliament.

== Administration ==
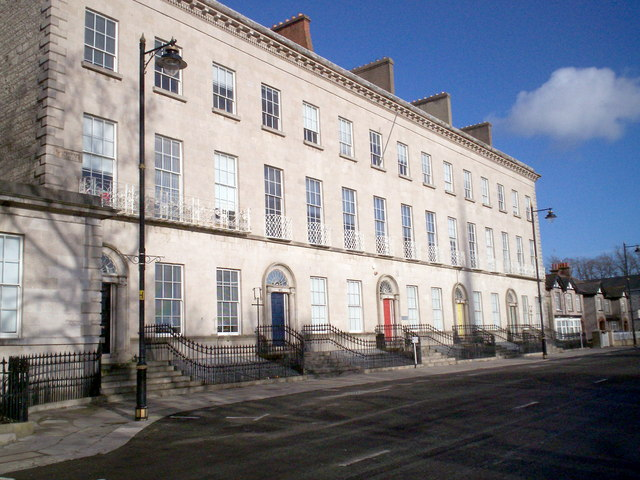
Former houses on Charlemont Place, beside The Mall, now occupied by Education Authority (Southern)

The Education Authority (Southern) and the Southern Health and Social Care Trust have their headquarters in the city, which has a long reputation as an administrative centre.

The secretariat of the North/South Ministerial Council is based in Armagh, and consists jointly of members of the civil services of both Northern Ireland and the Republic of Ireland.

Armagh is the seat of both the Church of Ireland Archbishop of Armagh and the Roman Catholic Archbishop of Armagh, both of whom hold the position of Primate of All Ireland for their respective denominations.

== Education ==
=== Primary ===
- Armstrong Primary School
- Christian Brothers Primary School Armagh
- The Drelincourt Primary School
- Dromintee Primary School
- Drumhillery Primary School
- Mount St Catherine's Primary School
- The Royal School Preparatory School
- Saints and Scholars Integrated Primary School
- St. Malachy's Primary School
- St. Patrick's Primary School

=== Post-primary ===
- City of Armagh High School
- St. Catherine's College, Armagh
- St. Patrick's Grammar School, Armagh
- The Royal School, Armagh
- Southern Regional College

== Transport ==
The Ulster Railway linked Armagh with Belfast in 1848 and Monaghan in 1858. The Newry and Armagh Railway (N&A) opened in 1864 and the Castleblayney, Keady and Armagh Railway (CK&A) was completed in 1910. In 1876 the Ulster Railway became part of the new Great Northern Railway (GNR), which took over the N&A in 1879 and the CK&A in 1911.

The Armagh rail disaster, which killed 80 people, occurred on 12 June 1889 on the N&A line near Armagh.

The partition of Ireland in 1922 hastened the railways' decline, and the GNR closed the Keady – Castleblayney section of the CKA in 1923. The GNR withdrew passenger trains from the Armagh – Keady section of the CKA in 1922 and closed the Armagh – Markethill section of the N&A in 1933. The Government of Northern Ireland forced the GNR Board to close all remaining lines serving Armagh railway station on 1 October 1957: the goods branch from Armagh to Keady and the main line through Armagh from Portadown as far as the border at Glaslough on the way to Monaghan.

Today Armagh is the only city in Ireland that is not served by rail; Portadown is the nearest station. NI Railways train services run from Portadown to Belfast Grand Central and the cross-border Enterprise service runs via Newry to Dublin Connolly. Poyntzpass also has a limited service.

When he was Minister for the Department for Regional Development, then MLA Danny Kennedy had indicated plans to restore the railway from Armagh station to Portadown.

== Sport ==
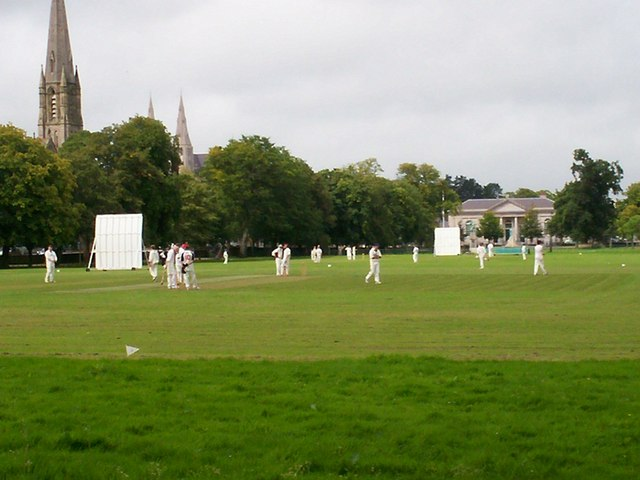
Armagh's Mall is home to the Armagh Cricket Club, and has also staged international matches.

Armagh City Football Club, which plays in the NIFL Championship is the main association football club, and the City of Armagh Rugby Club is the local rugby club. Lisanally Rangers F.C. and Armagh Blues F.C. play in the Mid-Ulster Football League. The Blues were Division 2 champions in 2020.

Gaelic football is represented by Armagh Harps and Pearse Ógs. The local GAA handball club is Eugene Quinn's, named after a player from the Armagh area who died on an attempted swim from Tory Island to mainland County Donegal. The local hurling club is Armagh Cúchulainns.

In 2004, the Royal School, Armagh became only the second team in history to win both the schools' rugby and hockey cups in the same year.

The Mall in Armagh has a long association with cricket, and is the location of the Armagh Cricket Club clubhouse.

Armagh Athletics Club, which was founded in 1969, organises the annual Armagh International 5k Road Race. The race was first organised in 1980.

== Notable people ==
Only people who are sufficiently notable to have individual entries on Wikipedia have been included in the list and, in each instance, their birth or residence has been verified by citations.

=== Living people ===
- Daragh Carville, playwright and screenwriter, whose works include Cherrybomb, was born in Armagh in 1969.
- David Cunningham, composer and record producer, was born in Armagh in 1954.
- John Lennox (born 1943), mathematician, grew up in Armagh and attended the Royal School. He specialises in group theory and is a philosopher of science and a Christian apologist.
- Seamus McGarvey, Academy Award-nominated cinematographer (Atonement, Anna Karenina), was born in Armagh in 1967.
- Colin Morgan, actor, known for playing the lead role in Merlin, was born in Armagh in 1986.

=== Historical figures ===
- Tom Boyd (1888–1952), Irish professional golfer, was born in Armagh.
- Moses Harvey (1820–1901), clergyman and naturalist, famous for studies of the giant squid, was born in Armagh.
- Patrick Magee (1922–1982), actor and director known for his collaborations with Samuel Beckett and Harold Pinter, was born in Armagh.
- Saint Malachy of Armagh (1094–1148) was born in Armagh.
- Ian Paisley (1926–2014), politician, founder of the Democratic Unionist Party and First Minister of Northern Ireland, was born in Armagh.
- Thomas Romney Robinson (1792–1882), astronomer, lived in Armagh.
- Christopher Vokes (1904–1985), Canadian Army Major-General, was born in Armagh.
- William Whitford (1846–1930), physician and temperance reformer, was born in Armagh.
- Charles Wood (1866–1926), composer, was born in Armagh.

== Climate ==
Armagh has a temperate maritime climate (Cfb) according to the Köppen climate classification system. The nearest Met Office standard weather station, at Armagh Observatory, provides long term weather data back to 1794. The lowest temperature was −15.0 °C (5.0 °F) on 7 February 1895. This is also the coldest temperature on record for February in Northern Ireland. Armagh also holds the record for highest daily minimum temperature in Northern Ireland, at 20.6 °C (69.1 °F) on 31 July 1868. The lowest daily maximum temperature on record is −8.0 °C (17.6 °F) which occurred on 20 December 2010.

Climate data for Armagh, elevation: 42 m (138 ft), 1991–2020 normals, extremes 1865–present
Month	Jan	Feb	Mar	Apr	May	Jun	Jul	Aug	Sep	Oct	Nov	Dec	Year
Record high °C (°F)	15.0 (59.0)	17.0 (62.6)	21.8 (71.2)	23.1 (73.6)	26.2 (79.2)	30.4 (86.7)	31.4 (88.5)	29.4 (84.9)	27.9 (82.2)	22.8 (73.0)	20.2 (68.4)	17.4 (63.3)	31.4 (88.5)
Mean daily maximum °C (°F)	7.8 (46.0)	8.6 (47.5)	10.4 (50.7)	13.0 (55.4)	15.8 (60.4)	18.2 (64.8)	19.7 (67.5)	19.4 (66.9)	17.3 (63.1)	13.7 (56.7)	10.3 (50.5)	8.0 (46.4)	13.6 (56.5)
Daily mean °C (°F)	5.0 (41.0)	5.3 (41.5)	6.7 (44.1)	8.8 (47.8)	11.4 (52.5)	14.0 (57.2)	15.7 (60.3)	15.5 (59.9)	13.5 (56.3)	10.3 (50.5)	7.3 (45.1)	5.2 (41.4)	9.9 (49.8)
Mean daily minimum °C (°F)	2.2 (36.0)	2.0 (35.6)	3.1 (37.6)	4.6 (40.3)	7.0 (44.6)	9.9 (49.8)	11.8 (53.2)	11.6 (52.9)	9.7 (49.5)	7.0 (44.6)	4.3 (39.7)	2.4 (36.3)	6.3 (43.3)
Record low °C (°F)	−14.4 (6.1)	−15.0 (5.0)	−12.8 (9.0)	−7.0 (19.4)	−2.4 (27.7)	0.6 (33.1)	0.0 (32.0)	−0.6 (30.9)	−0.6 (30.9)	−5.6 (21.9)	−8.0 (17.6)	−13.9 (7.0)	−15.0 (5.0)
Average precipitation mm (inches)	72.7 (2.86)	58.8 (2.31)	59.7 (2.35)	55.7 (2.19)	58.0 (2.28)	62.8 (2.47)	69.3 (2.73)	78.2 (3.08)	65.1 (2.56)	81.0 (3.19)	81.8 (3.22)	81.0 (3.19)	823.9 (32.44)
Average precipitation days (≥ 1.0 mm)	14.0	12.2	12.1	11.5	12.0	11.6	12.5	13.0	11.2	12.8	14.3	14.3	151.4
Mean monthly sunshine hours	47.4	70.8	101.5	149.6	179.3	144.8	134.7	140.2	114.2	92.2	61.6	42.9	1,279.2
Source 1: Met Office
Source 2: Starlings Roost Weather

== Annalistic references ==
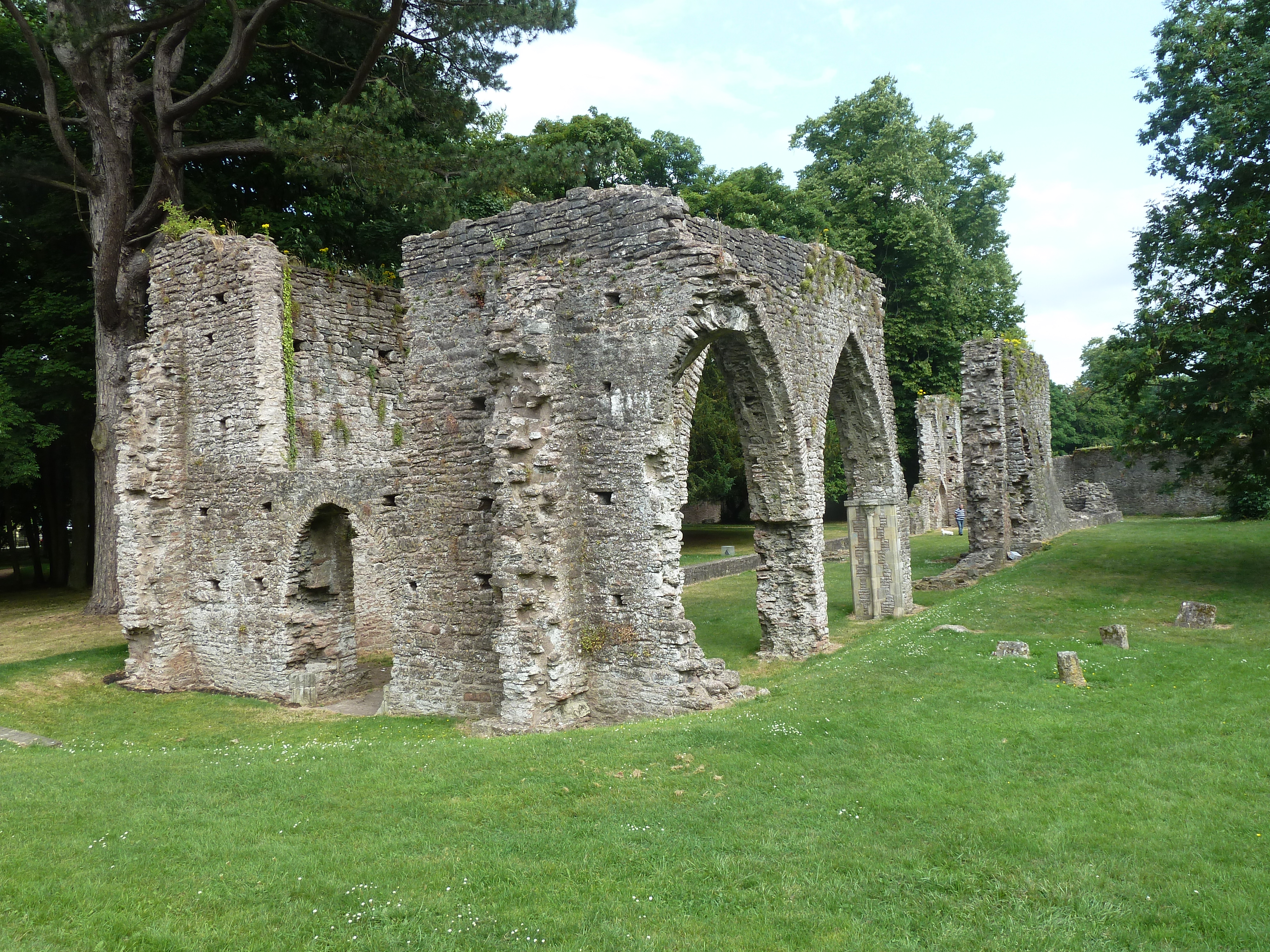
The remains of Armagh's Franciscan friary

See Annals of Inisfallen (AI) and Annals of Ulster (U)

- U444.1 Ard Macha was founded.
- U481.1 Repose of Iarlaithe son of Trian, third bishop of Ard Macha.
- U497.3 Repose of Cormac, bishop of Ard Macha, successor of Patrick.
- U513.2 Dubthach from Druim Derb, bishop of Ard Macha, died.
- U526.2 Ailill of the Uí Bresail, bishop of Ard Macha, rested.
- U536.4 Ailill, bishop of Ard Macha, died. He also was of the Uí Breasail.
- U548.1 Dubthach or Duach, of the seed of Colla Uais, abbot of Ard Macha, rested.
- U551.1 Repose of Dáuíd of Farannán, son of Guaire descendant of Farannán, bishop of Ard Macha and legate of all Ireland.
- U553.3 I have found this in the Book of Cuanu: The relics of Patrick were placed sixty years after his death in a shrine by Colum Cille. Three splendid halidoms were found in the burial-place: his goblet, the Angel's Gospel, and the Bell of the Testament. This is how the angel distributed the halidoms: the goblet to Dún, the Bell of the Testament to Ard Macha, and the Angel's Gospel to Colum Cille himself. The reason it is called the Angel's Gospel is that Colum Cille received it from the hand of the angel.
- U553.4 Or here, the repose of Dáuíd; bishop of Ard Macha and legate.
- U578.3 Feidlimid Finn, abbot of Ard Macha, rested.
- U588.1 Repose of Cairlén, bishop of Ard Macha—the bishop of Ard Macha, i.e. Ciarlaech from the territory of the Uí Nialláin.
- U598.3 Eochu, abbot of Ard Macha, rested.
- U610.3 Senach from Cluain Uaingrighe, abbot of Ard Macha, rested.
- U623.2 Repose of Mac Laisre, abbot of Ard Macha, and of Finnia, abbot of Ner.
- U661.1 Tóiméne son of Rónán, bishop of Ard Macha, and Conaing grandson of Dant, abbot of Imlech Ibair, and the sage Laidcnén son of Baeth Bannach, died.
- U672.1 The battle of Dúngal son of Mael Tuile; and the burning of Ard Macha and of the house of Taille son of Ségéne.
- U688.1 Repose of Ségéne from Achad Claidib, bishop of Ard Macha.
- U690.2 The burning of Ard Macha.
- AI715.2 Flann.Febla, abbot of Ard Macha, rested.
- U719.9 The killing of the community of Suibne in Ard Macha.
- U725.4 Colmán Uamach, scribe of Ard Macha ... fell asleep.
- AI729.1 Kl. Repose of Suibne, abbot of Ard Macha. (= U730.5)
- U731.10 Death of Echaid son of Colgu, anchorite of Ard Macha.
- U732.14 Fergus son of Conall Oircnech, and Ferdomnach, scribe of Ard Macha, died.
- U733.10 Do-Chumas of Bolgán, anchorite of Ard Macha, rested.
- AI750.1 Kl. Repose of Congus, abbot of Ard Macha. = U750.3
- U758.2 Céile Petair from Crích Bresail, abbot of Ard Macha, died.
- AI768.3 Repose of Feradach son of Suibne, abbot of Ard Macha. (= U768.4)
- AI772.2 Suibne, abbot of Ard Macha, [rested].
- U775.2 The burning of Ard Macha
- U781.2 A great disturbance in Ard Macha on Quinquagesima day, in which Condálach son of Ailill fell.
- U783.3 The burning of Ard Macha and Mag Eó na Saxan.
- U784.2 ... Cernach son of Suibne, steward of Ard Macha ... died.
- U789.8 A quarrel in Ard Macha, in which a man was killed in front of the stone oratory.
- AI791.1 Kl. Cú Dínisc son of Cú Ásaig, abbot of Ard Macha, rested. (= U791.1)
- AI793.1 Dub dá Leithe, abbot of Ard Macha, rested. (= U793.1)
- U793.4 The profanation of Faendelach by Gormgal son of Dindanach; and Ard Macha was entered and invaded, and people were slain in it by the Uí Chremthainn. Faendelach was received again in Ard Macha.
- AI794.1 Kl. Airechtach, abbot of Ard Macha, [rested].
- U794.1 Airechtach grandson of Faelán alias grandson of Fledach, abbot of Ard Macha, and Affiath, bishop of Ard Macha, fell asleep peacefully on the same night.
- AI795.3 Repose of Faendledach Bec, abbot of Ard Macha. (= U795.4)
- U796.3 The steward of Ard Macha, Echu son of Cernach, died prematurely.
- U804.7 A meeting of the synods of the Uí Néill in Dún Cuair, presided over by Connmach, abbot of Ard Macha.
- U806.2 Gormgal son of Dindathach, abbot of Ard Macha and Cluain Eóis, died.
- AI807.1 Kl. Connmach son of Dub dá Leithe, abbot of Ard Macha, rested. (= U807.1)
- AI808.1 Kl. Taicthech grandson of Tigernán, lector of Ard Macha, rested. (= U809.1)
- U808.1 Death of Torbach alias Calbhach from Cluain Cracha, scribe and abbot of Ard Macha.
- U810.1 Mael Dúin son of Donngal, steward of Ard Macha ... died.
- U811.1 Nuadu, abbot of Ard Macha, went to Connacht with Patrick's law and his casket.
- U812.4 Nuadu of Loch Uama, bishop, anchorite and abbot of Ard Macha, fell asleep.
- U817.3 Cumuscach son of Cernach, steward of Ard Macha, died.
- U818.5 Artrí, superior of Ard Macha, went to Connacht with the shrine of Patrick.
- U819.8 At Ard Macha Whitsun 5 June was not publicly celebrated nor the shrine taken on tour; and there was a disturbance in which the son of Echaid son of Fiachna fell.
- U823.5 Patrick's law was imposed on Mumu by Feidlimid son of Crimthann, and by Artri son of Conchobor i.e. bishop of Ard Macha.
- U823.10 Fire from heaven struck the abbot's mansion in Ard Macha and burned it.
- U825.14 Patrick's law was imposed on the three Connachta by Artrí son of Conchobor, bishop of Ard Macha.
- U826.3 Loingsech's son, abbot of Ard Macha, died peacefully.
- U827.2 The dishonouring of Eogan in Ard Macha by Cumuscach son of Cathal and by Artrí son of Conchobor.
- U830.9 Suibne son of Fairnech alias son of Forannán abbot of Ard Macha for two months, died.
- U831.4 Cernach son of Dunchú, scribe, man of learning, and priest of Ard Macha, rested.
- U831.7 The heathens defeated the community of Ard Macha in a battle at Aignig, and great numbers of them were taken captive.
- U831.8 Eógan of Mainister abbot of Ard Macha was dishonoured over a legal decision (?) by Conchobor son of Donnchad, and his followers were taken prisoner, and his horses taken away.
- U832.1 The first plundering of Ard Macha by the heathens three times in one month.
- U833.1 Artrí son of Conchobor, abbot of Ard Macha ... died in the same month.
- AI834.1 Kl. Eógan, bishop of Ard Macha, rested. (= U834.2)
- AI845.2 Forannán, abbot of Ard Macha, was carried off by the heathens from Cluain Comarda, and the shrine of Pátraic was broken and carried off by them.
- AI846.1 Kl. Niall son of Aed, king of Temuir, was drowned in the Calann, i.e. a river beside Ard Macha.
- AI852.2 Forannan and Diarmait, abbots of Ard Macha, fell asleep.
- AI852.2 Repose of Cathasach, abbot of Ard Macha.
- AI874.1 Kl. The third feria [Tuesday], ninth of the moon. Féthgna, abbot of Ard Macha, rested in Christ.
- AI883.2 Repose of Cathasach, abbot of Ard Macha.
- AI888.3 Repose of Mael Coba son of Crunnmael, abbot of Ard Macha.
- AI893.1 First after Bissextile. Kl. Repose of Mochta, bishop of Ard Macha.
- AI924.2 Muiredach son of Domnall, abbot of Mainister Búiti and tanist-abbot of Ard Macha, rested.
- AI927.1 Kl. Repose of Mael Brigte son of Tornán, abbot of Ard Macha and abbot of Í Coluim Chille.
- AI936.1 Kl. Repose of Ioseph, abbot of Ard Macha; and Mael Pátraic succeeded him in the abbacy.
- AI966.2 Repose of Muiredach son of Fergus, abbot of Ard Macha.
- AI973.3 Dub dá Leithe, coarb of Patrick, came to Mumu and made his visitation; and he and the coarb of Ailbe quarrelled regarding the levy, and Mathgamain, king of Mumu, made peace between them, and they agreed upon the perpetual right of [the coarb of] Patrick.
- AI996.4 Ard Macha was set on fire by lightning, which did not leave unburnt a steeple therein, nor a house, nor the house of an elder inside the fort.
- AI996.5 Dub dá Leithe, coarb of Ard Macha (or, of Patrick) and coarb of Colum Cille, rested in Christ.
- AI1001.2 Muirecán, abbot of Ard Macha, was expelled from his abbot's seat, and Mael Maire took the abbacy instead.
- AI1005.5 Repose of Eochaid ua Flannacáin, historian of Ard Macha.
- AI1020.3 Mael Muire son of Eochaid, coarb of Patrick, rested in Christ.
- AI1020.4 Ard Macha was burned, both stone-church and bellhouse, and all the buildings.
- AI1026.3 The coarb of Patrick, accompanied by his venerable clerics, and Donnchadh son of Gilla Pátraic, king of Osraige, [were] in the house of Donnchad, son of Brian, at Cenn Corad at Eastertide.
- AI1029.8 Flaithbertach Ua Néill, on his pilgrimage to Ard Macha.

== See also ==
- Book of Armagh
- List of localities in Northern Ireland by population
- Market houses in Northern Ireland
- List of archaeological sites in County Armagh
