= List of Grade A listed buildings in County Antrim =

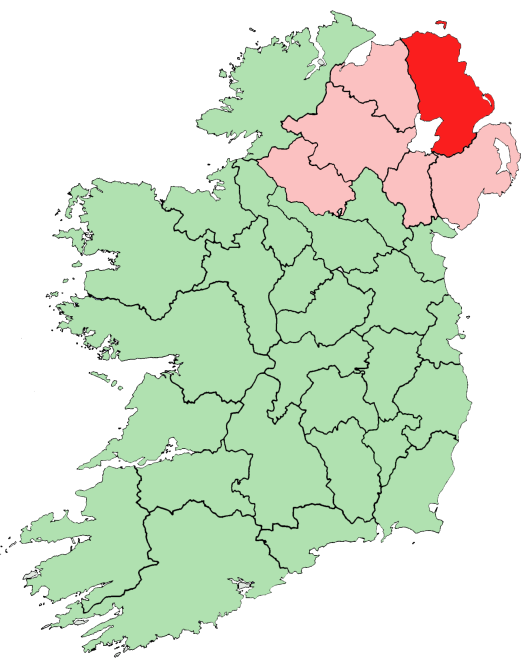
County Antrim within Ireland

This is a list of Grade A listed buildings in County Antrim, Northern Ireland.

In Northern Ireland, the term listed building refers to a building or other structure officially designated as being of "special architectural or historic interest". Grade A structures are those considered to be "buildings of greatest importance to Northern Ireland including both outstanding architectural set-pieces and the least altered examples of each representative style, period and type." Once listed, severe restrictions are imposed on the modifications allowed to a building's structure or its fittings. Listed building consent must be obtained from local authorities prior to any alteration to such a structure.

Listing began later in Northern Ireland than in the rest of the UK: the first provision for listing was contained in the Planning (Northern Ireland) Order 1972; and the current legislative basis for listing is the Planning (Northern Ireland) Order 1991. Under Article 42 of the Order, the relevant Department of the Northern Ireland Executive is required to compile lists of buildings of "special architectural or historic interest". Since 2016, the responsibility for the listing process rests with the Historic Environment Division of the Department for Communities (DfC).

Following the introduction of listing, an initial survey of Northern Ireland's building stock was begun in 1974. By the time of the completion of this First Survey in 1994, the listing process had developed considerably, and it was therefore decided to embark upon a Second Survey, which is still ongoing, to update and cross-check the original information. Information gathered during this survey, relating to both listed and unlisted buildings, is entered into the publicly accessible Northern Ireland Buildings Database. A range of listing criteria, which aim to define architectural and historic interest, are used to determine whether or not to list a building.

County Antrim covers 2,844 square kilometres (1,098 sq mi), and has a population of around 616,000. The County has 79 Grade A listed buildings, of which 37 are located within the city of Belfast.

== Listed buildings ==
Building address	Grid Ref. (Note: Sometimes known as OSGB36, the grid reference is based on the British national grid reference system used by the Ordnance Survey.) Geo-coordinates	Type (Note: The type of structure, as identified by the DfC.)	Local authority	Second Survey	Original Survey	HB Number (Note: The "HB Number" is a unique number assigned to each listed building by the DfC.)	Image	Ref.
Randalstown Presbyterian Church (Old Congregation), Portglenone Road, Randalstown	54°45′00″N 6°19′29″W	Church	Antrim	A	A	HB20/04/001	Upload Photo	
Shane's Castle Camellia House, Antrim	54°43′37″N 6°16′07″W	Glass House	Antrim	A	A	HB20/04/042 A	Upload another image See more images	
Shane's Castle ruins, Antrim	54°43′38″N 6°16′07″W	Country House	Antrim	A	A	HB20/04/042 C	Upload another image See more images	
Terrace, Shane's Castle, Antrim	54°43′36″N 6°16′07″W	Garden Features	Antrim	A	A	HB20/04/042 E	Upload Photo	
Court House, Market Square, Antrim	54°42′54″N 6°13′17″W	Court House	Antrim	A	A	HB20/08/008	Upload Photo	
All Saints Parish Church, Church Street, Antrim	54°42′49″N 6°13′04″W	Church	Antrim	A	A	HB20/08/017	Upload Photo	
Long Canals and Round Pond, Antrim Castle Gardens, Antrim	54°43′07″N 6°13′26″W	Garden Features	Antrim	A	A	HB20/08/054	Upload another image	
Castle Upton, Antrim Road, Templepatrick	54°42′18″N 6°05′49″W	Country House	Antrim	A	A	HB20/12/018 A	Upload another image See more images	
The Adam Yard, Castle Upton, Templepatrick	54°42′20″N 6°05′47″W	House	Antrim	A	A	HB20/12/018 B-L	Upload Photo	
Entrance Gate and Lodges, Castle Upton	54°42′12″N 6°05′46″W	Gates/ Screens/ Lodges	Antrim	A	B1	HB20/12/018 M	Upload Photo	
Templeton Mausoleum, Castle Upton	54°42′23″N 6°05′43″W	Mausoleum	Antrim	A	A	HB20/12/018 P	Upload another image	
Former Control Tower, Langford Lodge Airfield, Largy Road, Crumlin	54°36′55″N 6°18′26″W	World War II Structures	Antrim	A	Not listed	HB20/14/029	Upload Photo	
Non-Subscribing Presbyterian Church, Main Street, Crumlin	54°37′09″N 6°12′54″W	Church	Antrim	A	B+	HB20/15/007	Upload another image	
Galgorm Castle, Ballymena	54°51′26″N 6°19′00″W	Country House	Ballymena	–	A	HB07/15/001 A	Upload another image See more images	
Moravian Church and 21 and 25 Church Road, Gracehill	54°51′12″N 6°19′42″W	Church	Ballymena	–	A	HB07/15/002	Upload another image See more images	
Early memorials in graveyard of Moravian Church, Gracehill	54°51′12″N 6°19′42″W	Memorial	Ballymena	–	A	HB07/15/003	Upload another image	
Benvarden, Ballybogey, Ballymoney	55°08′14″N 6°30′58″W	Country House	Ballymoney	–	A	HB04/02/002	Upload another image	
Leslie Hill, Ballypatrick, Ballymoney	55°04′20″N 6°32′08″W	Country House	Ballymoney	–	A	HB04/15/008	Upload Photo	
St. Peter's Cathedral, Belfast	54°35′56″N 5°56′40″W	Church	Belfast	–	A	HB26/33/003	Upload another image See more images	
St. Mark's Church, Holywood Road, Dundela, Belfast	54°36′11″N 5°52′29″W	Church	Belfast	–	A	HB26/12/017	Upload another image See more images	
Main Building, Stranmillis College, Stranmillis Road, Belfast	54°34′24″N 5°56′04″W	University/ College Building	Belfast	–	A	HB26/17/049	Upload another image See more images	
The Palm House, Belfast Botanic Gardens, Stranmillis Road, Belfast	54°35′01″N 5°56′01″W	Glass House	Belfast	–	A	HB26/27/003	Upload another image See more images	
Assembly's College (Theological College Of Presbyterian Church), Botanic Avenue, Belfast	54°35′06″N 5°55′53″W	University/ College Building	Belfast	–	A	HB26/27/004	Upload another image See more images	
Lanyon Building, Queen's University Belfast	54°35′04″N 5°56′07″W	University/ College Building	Belfast	–	A	HB26/27/005	Upload another image See more images	
Elmwood Hall, Elmwood Avenue, Belfast	54°35′03″N 5°56′15″W	Hall	Belfast	–	A	HB26/28/002	Upload another image See more images	
Grand Opera House, Great Victoria Street, Belfast	54°35′43″N 5°56′06″W	Entertainment Building	Belfast	–	A	HB26/29/001	Upload another image See more images	
Crown Liquor Saloon, 46 Great Victoria Street, Belfast	54°35′41″N 5°56′03″W	Public House	Belfast	–	A	HB26/30/003	Upload another image See more images	
St. Malachy's Church, Alfred Street, Belfast	54°35′39″N 5°55′37″W	Church	Belfast	–	A	HB26/30/023	Upload another image See more images	
Ulster Hall, 1–7 Bedford Street, Belfast	54°35′41″N 5°55′50″W	Entertainment Building	Belfast	A	–	HB26/30/057	Upload another image See more images	
St. Matthew's Church, Woodvale Road, Belfast	54°36′24″N 5°57′37″W	Church	Belfast	–	A	HB26/37/006	Upload Photo	
County Gaol, Crumlin Road, Belfast	54°36′32″N 5°56′33″W	Prison	Belfast	A	B1	HB26/43/012	Upload another image See more images	
Belfast Charitable Institution (Clifton House), Clifton Street, Belfast	54°36′23″N 5°56′00″W	Residential Home	Belfast	–	A	HB26/49/001	Upload another image See more images	
Belfast City Hall, Donegall Square, Belfast	54°35′48″N 5°55′49″W	Town Hall	Belfast	–	A	HB26/50/001	Upload another image See more images	
First Marquis of Dufferin Memorial, Donegall Square, Belfast	54°35′47″N 5°55′52″W	Memorial	Belfast	–	A	HB26/50/002	Upload another image See more images	
Boer War Monument, Donegall Square, Belfast	54°35′47″N 5°55′44″W	Memorial	Belfast	–	A	HB26/50/003	Upload another image See more images	
Cenotaph and Garden of Remembrance, Donegall Square, Belfast	54°35′46″N 5°55′51″W	Memorial	Belfast	–	A	HB26/50/005	Upload another image See more images	
Titanic Monument, Donegall Square, Belfast	54°35′48″N 5°55′44″W	Memorial	Belfast	–	A	HB26/50/006	Upload another image See more images	
Sir Edward Harland Memorial, Donegall Square, Belfast	54°35′49″N 5°55′45″W	Memorial	Belfast	–	A	HB26/50/007	Upload another image See more images	
Sir Robert McMordie Memorial, Donegall Square, Belfast	54°35′49″N 5°55′52″W	Memorial	Belfast	–	A	HB26/50/008	Upload another image See more images	
Sir Daniel Dixon Monument, Donegall Square, Belfast	54°35′49″N 5°55′51″W	Memorial	Belfast	–	A	HB26/50/009	Upload Photo	
Victoria Monument, Donegall Square, Belfast	54°35′49″N 5°55′48″W	Memorial	Belfast	–	A	HB26/50/010	Upload another image See more images	
Sir James Haslett Memorial, Donegall Square, Belfast	54°35′49″N 5°55′45″W	Memorial	Belfast	–	A	HB26/50/011	Upload another image See more images	
Former Water Office, 1 Donegall Square, Belfast	54°35′51″N 5°55′45″W	Shop	Belfast	–	A	HB26/50/015	Upload another image See more images	
Royal Belfast Academical Institution, College Square, Belfast	54°35′49″N 5°56′11″W	School	Belfast	–	A	HB26/50/023	Upload another image See more images	
St. George's Church, High Street, Belfast	54°36′01″N 5°55′30″W	Church	Belfast	–	A	HB26/50/045	Upload another image See more images	
McCausland's Building (Hotel), 34-38 Victoria Street, Belfast	54°36′00″N 5°55′27″W	Office	Belfast	–	A	HB26/50/046	Upload another image	
First Presbyterian Church (Non-Subscribing), 41 Rosemary Street, Belfast	54°36′01″N 5°55′47″W	Church	Belfast	–	A	HB26/50/054	Upload another image	
Former Ulster Bank Head Office, Waring Street, Belfast	54°36′04″N 5°55′32″W	Hotel	Belfast	–	A	HB26/50/058	Upload another image See more images	
Custom House, Custom House Square, Belfast	54°36′06″N 5°55′22″W	Office	Belfast	–	A	HB26/50/062	Upload another image See more images	
St. Anne's Cathedral, Donegall Street, Belfast	54°36′10″N 5°55′44″W	Church	Belfast	–	A	HB26/50/067	Upload another image See more images	
Clarendon Building, Clarendon Quay, Belfast	54°36′22″N 5°55′15″W	Office	Belfast	A	A	HB26/50/090 A	Upload Photo	
Harbour Office, Corporation Square, Belfast	54°36′19″N 5°55′19″W	Office	Belfast	–	A	HB26/50/094	Upload another image	
Tesco (former Provincial Bank of Ireland), 2 Royal Avenue, Belfast	54°35′58″N 5°55′51″W	Bank	Belfast	–	A	HB26/50/106	Upload another image	
Old Museum Buildings, 7 College Square, Belfast	54°35′51″N 5°56′18″W	Gallery/ Museum	Belfast	–	A	HB26/50/112 B	Upload another image	
Royal Courts Of Justice, Chichester Street, Belfast	54°35′50″N 5°55′20″W	Court House	Belfast	–	A	HB26/50/180	Upload another image See more images	
McHugh's Bar, 31-33 Queen's Square, Belfast	54°36′03″N 5°55′23″W	Public House	Belfast	–	A	HB26/50/274	Upload another image See more images	
St. Nicholas' Church, Lancasterian Street, Carrickfergus	54°42′54″N 5°48′31″W	Church	Carrickfergus	–	A	HB22/08/001	Upload another image See more images	
Castle Dobbs, Tongue Loanen, Carrickfergus	54°44′38″N 5°45′30″W	Country House	Carrickfergus	A	A	HB22/13/001 A	Upload Photo	
Glenarm Castle, Glenarm	54°57′58″N 5°57′24″W	Country House	Larne	A	A	HB06/02/001 A	Upload another image See more images	
Ballygally Castle, Coast Road, Ballygalley, Larne	54°53′56″N 5°51′42″W	Hotel	Larne	A	A	HB06/03/011	Upload another image See more images	
The Brewhouse and walling, Red Hall, Ballycarry	54°46′54″N 5°44′51″W	House	Larne	A	A	HB06/05/013 A	Upload Photo	
Red Hall, Ballycarry	54°46′53″N 5°44′51″W	Country House	Larne	A	A	HB06/05/013 B	Upload Photo	
4 Trummery Lane, Trummery, Maghaberry	54°29′59″N 6°11′18″W	House	Lisburn	A	A	HB19/03/048	Upload Photo	
Christ Church Cathedral, Market Square, Lisburn	54°30′40″N 6°02′35″W	Church	Lisburn	A	A	HB19/16/001	Upload another image See more images	
Fountain, Castle Gardens, Lisburn	54°30′43″N 6°02′25″W	Fountain	Lisburn	–	A	HB19/16/015	Upload another image	
Christ Church, Derriaghy, Lisburn	54°32′33″N 6°01′56″W	Church	Lisburn	–	A	HB19/18/008	Upload another image See more images	
First Presbyterian Church (Non-Subscribing), Dunmurry	54°33′03″N 6°00′27″W	Church	Lisburn	–	A	HB19/20/005	Upload Photo	
Holy Trinity Church, The Diamond, Ballycastle	55°12′02″N 6°15′00″W	Church	Moyle	A	A	HB05/14/001	Upload another image See more images	
Railway Viaduct (1), Bleach Green Junction, Newtownabbey	54°40′51″N 5°54′10″W	Viaduct	Newtownabbey	A	B1	HB21/10/001 A	Upload Photo	
Railway Viaduct (2), Bleach Green Junction, Newtownabbey	54°40′51″N 5°54′08″W	Viaduct	Newtownabbey	A	B1	HB21/10/001 B	Upload Photo	
Church of St Patrick, Jordanstown Road, Jordanstown	54°41′20″N 5°53′56″W	Church	Newtownabbey	A	A	HB21/11/001	Upload Photo	

== See also ==
- List of Grade B+ listed buildings in County Antrim
