= List of Grade B+ listed buildings in County Antrim =

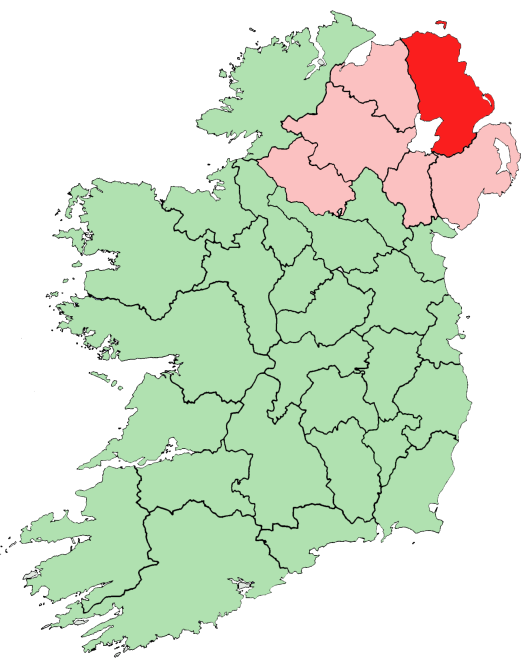
County Antrim within Ireland

This is a list of Grade B+ listed buildings in County Antrim, Northern Ireland.

In Northern Ireland, the term listed building refers to a building or other structure officially designated as being of "special architectural or historic interest". Grade B+ structures are those considered to be "buildings which might have merited grade A status but for detracting features such as an incomplete design, lower quality additions or alterations. Also included are buildings that because of exceptional features, interiors or environmental qualities are clearly above the general standard set by grade B buildings. A building may merit listing as grade B+ where its historic importance is greater than a similar building listed as grade B."

Listing began later in Northern Ireland than in the rest of the UK; the first provision for listing was contained in the Planning (Northern Ireland) Order 1972, and the current legislative basis for listing is the Planning (Northern Ireland) Order 1991. Under Article 42 of the Order, the Department of the Environment of the Northern Ireland Executive is required to compile lists of buildings of "special architectural or historic interest". The responsibility for the listing process rests with the Northern Ireland Environment Agency (NIEA), an executive agency within the Department of the Environment.

Following the introduction of listing, an initial survey of Northern Ireland's building stock was begun in 1974. By the time of the completion of this First Survey in 1994, the listing process had developed considerably, and it was therefore decided to embark upon a Second Survey to update and cross-check the original information. As of April 2010, the Second Survey had been completed for 147 of Northern Ireland's 547 council wards, and completion is anticipated by 2016. Information gathered during this survey, relating to both listed and unlisted buildings, is entered into the publicly accessible Northern Ireland Buildings Database. A range of listing criteria, which aim to define architectural and historic interest, have been developed by the NIEA, and are used to determine whether or not to list a building.

Once listed, severe restrictions are imposed on the modifications allowed to a building's structure or its fittings. Listed building consent must be obtained from local authorities prior to any alteration to such a structure. There are approximately 8,500 listed buildings in Northern Ireland, representing 2% of the total building stock. Of these, around 580 are listed at Grade B+.

County Antrim covers 2,844 square kilometres (1,098 sq mi), and has a population of around 616,000. The County has 157 Grade B+ listed buildings.

== Listed buildings ==
Building address	Grid Ref. (Note: Sometimes known as OSGB36, the grid reference is based on the British national grid reference system used by the Ordnance Survey.) Geo-coordinates	Type (Note: The type of structure, as identified by the DfC.)	Local authority	Second Survey	Original Survey	HB Number (Note: The "HB Number" is a unique number assigned to each listed building by the DfC.)	Image
Moore Lodge, 166 Vow Road, Ballymoney		Country House	Ballymoney		B+	HB04/11/003 A	Upload Photo
Our Lady and St. Patrick R.C. Church, Castle St., Ballymoney		Church	Ballymoney		B+	HB04/14/001	Upload another image
Ballypatrick, Ballymoney		Outbuildings	Ballymoney		B+	HB04/15/009	Upload Photo
Turnley's Tower, Cushendall		Tower	Moyle		B+	HB05/02/001	Upload another image
Glendun Viaduct Irragh/Clegnagh TLs Glendun		Viaduct	Moyle		B+	HB05/03/026	Upload another image See more images
Rockport Lodge, Gates and Railings, Cushendun		House	Moyle		B+	HB05/03/023	Upload Photo
St Olcan's R.C. Church, 160 Glenshesk Road, Armoy, Ballymoney		Church	Moyle	B+	B	HB05/05/012	Upload Photo
Billy C of I Parish Church, 1 Cabragh Road, Glebe TD, Bushmills BT57 8UD		Church	Moyle	B+	B	HB05/07/001	Upload another image
"Dundarave" and Outbuildings, 20 Dundarave Road, Clogher, North Bushmills		Country House	Moyle		B+	HB05/08/005	Upload Photo
Ballintoy Parish Church, Gates and Walling, Ballintoy Demesne		Church	Moyle		B+	HB05/10/001	Upload another image See more images
McKinley & Clarke 72 Castle Street Ballycastle BT54 6AR		Shop - Terrace	Moyle	B+	B1	HB05/13/006	Upload another image
The Boyd Arms, 4 The Diamond, Ballycastle BT54 6AW		Public House	Moyle	B+	B1	HB05/13/022	Upload another image
Ramoan House, 11 Novally Road, Ballycastle BT54 6HB		Residential Home	Moyle	B+	B	HB05/15/024	Upload Photo
Ballycastle Museum (former court house), 59 Castle Street, Ballycastle BT54 6AR		Gallery/ Museum	Moyle	B+	B1	HB05/15/016	Upload another image See more images
St Thomas' (C of I) Church, Rathlin Island		CHURCH	Moyle		B+	HB05/16/003	Upload another image See more images
Manor House, Outbuildinds and Walling, Rathlin Island		House	Moyle		B+	HB05/16/001 A	Upload another image
Church of the Immaculate Conception (RC), Rathlin Island		Church	Moyle		B+	HB05/16/002	Upload another image See more images
Drumnasole House, 8 Tower Road, Carnlough, Ballymena BT44 0JW		Country House	Larne	B+	B	HB06/01/025	Upload Photo
Lemnalary House, 88 Largy Road, Carnlough, Ballymena BT44 0JJ		House	Larne	B+	B+	HB06/01/020	Upload Photo
St Patricks (C of I) Parish Church, The Cloney, Glenarm, Ballymena BT44 0AB		Church	Larne	B+	B	HB06/02/071	Upload Photo
Former court house (now Glenarm Baptist Church) 43-45 Toberwine Street Glenarm Ballymena BT44 0AP		Church	Larne	B+	B+	HB06/02/037	Upload Photo
27-29 Altmore Street Glenarm Ballymena BT44 0AR		House	Larne	B+	B1	HB06/02/019	Upload Photo
House at 53 Deerpark Road, Drumcrow Glenarm Ballymena BT44 0BH		House	Larne	B+		HB06/02/082	Upload Photo
St John’s C. of I., Church Low Road, Ballyharry, Islandmagee, Larne		Church	Larne	B+	B+	HB06/04/011	Upload another image
Raloo Church of Ireland Parish Church, Glenoe, Larne		Church	Larne	B+	B	HB06/05/026	Upload another image
St Cedma’s C of I Church, Inver Road Larne		Church	Larne	B+	B+	HB06/06/001	Upload another image
Drumalis Retreat Centre 47, Glenarm Road, Larne		Religious House	Larne	B+	B+	HB06/08/005	Upload Photo
Lisnamoyle, 119 The Roddens, Larne BT40 1PR		House	Larne	B+	B+	HB06/11/008	Upload Photo
Town Hall, Upper Cross Street, Larne BT40 1SZ		Town hall	Larne	B+	B+	HB06/12/002	Upload another image See more images
Hillmount House and Entrance Screen, 72 Hillmount Road, Craigs, Cullybackey, Ballymena		House	Ballymena		B+	HB07/02/004	Upload Photo
Peter Stott Martin House (formerly Craigdun Castle), 32 Dunminning Road, Craigs, Cullybackey, Ballymena		House	Ballymena		B+	HB07/02/009 B	Upload Photo
The Thatch Inn, 57 Main Street, Broughshane, BT42 4JP		Public House	Ballymena	B+	B+	HB07/04/006	Upload another image
First Presbyterian Church, 54 Main St., Broughshane		Church	Ballymena		B+	HB07/04/002	Upload another image
Arthur Cottage, Dreen, Cullybackey, Ballymena BT42 1EB		Gallery/ Museum	Ballymena	B+	B1	HB07/07/009	Upload Photo
Old cruck house at 77 Straid Road, Ballyminstra, Ahoghill, Ballymena BT42 2JQ		House	Ballymena	B+	B+	HB07/08/016	Upload Photo
"Whiteshill" Ballylummin, Ahoghill, Ballymena		House	Ballymena		B+	HB07/08/010	Upload Photo
39 Cockhill Road, Hannahstown, Ballymena BT42 2JP		House	Ballymena	B+	B1	HB07/10/017	Upload Photo
Shank Bridge, Kildrum, Ballymena		Bridge	Ballymena		B+	HB07/10/011	Upload Photo
4 Brocklamont Park, Ballymena		House	Ballymena		B+	HB07/15/044	Upload Photo
St. Patrick's Church, 57 Castle St., Ballymena		Church	Ballymena		B+	HB07/17/001	Upload another image See more images
Ballinderry Middle Church, Lower Ballinderry Road, Brakenhill, Glenavy, Crumlin BT28 2JH		Church	Lisburn	B+	B+	HB19/01/040	Upload another image
2-4 Lower Ballinderry Road, Upper Ballinderry, Lisburn BT28 2EP		Shop	Lisburn	B+	B2	HB19/01/042	Upload Photo
Bessvale, 63 Ballinderry Road, Lisburn, BT28 2NW		House	Lisburn	B+	B1	HB19/03/038	Upload Photo
Railway bridge over canal, Station Rd, Moira, Craigavon, Co Armagh BT67		Bridge	Lisburn	B+		HB19/03/013	Upload Photo
All Saints Church of Ireland, Eglantine Road, Hillsborough BT27 5RQ		Church	Lisburn	B+	B	HB19/04/001	Upload another image See more images
Ballyskeagh Bridge, Ballyskeagh Road, Lisburn		Bridge	Lisburn	B+	B+	HB19/09/007	Upload another image
Wolfenden's Bridge, Ballyskeagh Road, Lisburn		Bridge	Lisburn	B+	B1	HB19/09/008	Upload another image
35 Castle Street, Lisburn, BT27 4SP		University/ College Building	Lisburn	B+	B	HB19/13/004	Upload Photo
68 Bow Street, Lisburn, BT28 1AL		Office - Terrace	Lisburn	B+	B1	HB19/13/001	Upload Photo
Lambeg Parish Church, Church Hill, Lambeg, North Lisburn, BT27 4SB		Church	Lisburn	B+	B	HB19/17/004 A	Upload another image See more images
St. Colman's Church of Ireland, Dunmurry		Church	Lisburn		B+	HB19/20/011	Upload Photo
Presbyterian Church, Ashley Park, Dunmurry		Church	Lisburn		B+	HB19/20/007	Upload Photo
140 Upper Dunmurry Lane, Dunmurry BT17 0HE		Religious House	Lisburn	B+	B1	HB19/21/007	Upload Photo
Our Lady of Lourdes Roman Catholic Church, Moneyglass Road, Moneyglass, Toomebridge, BT41 3PT		Church	Antrim	B+	B+	HB20/01/015 A	Upload another image
Duneane Presbyterian Church, Gloverstown Road, Toomebridge, BT41 3RB		Church	Antrim	B+	B+	HB20/01/019 A	Upload another image
Ballygrooby Lodge, Shane's Street, Randalstown, Antrim BT41 4NA		Gates/ Screens/ Lodges	Antrim	B+	A	HB20/04/042 I	Upload Photo
Railway Viaduct, Randalstown, Antrim		Viaduct	Antrim	B+	B1	HB20/04/024	Upload another image
Castle Bawn, 17 Maghereagh Road, Randalstown, Antrim BT41 4NS		House	Antrim	B+		HB20/04/067	Upload Photo
Gates and screen, First Presbyterian Church, 80 Church Street, Antrim BT41 4BA		Gates/ Screens/ Lodges	Antrim	B+	A	HB20/08/023 A	Upload Photo
First Presbyterian Church, 80 Church Street, Antrim BT41 4BA		Church	Antrim	B+	A	HB20/08/023 B	Upload another image
Pogue's Entry Historical Cottage, 40-54 Church Street, Antrim BT41 4BA		Gallery/ Museum	Antrim	B+	B+	HB20/08/020	Upload another image
St. Comgall's Church, Castle Street, Antrim		Church	Antrim	B+	B+	HB20/08/050	Upload another image
Clotworthy House, Randalstown Road, Antrim BT41 4LH		Gallery/ Museum	Antrim	B+	B1	HB20/08/004	Upload another image
Deerpark Bridge, Antrim Castle Gardens, Randalstown Road, Antrim		Bridge	Antrim	B+	B2	HB20/08/003	Upload another image
The Steeple, Steeple Road, Antrim BT41 1BJ		Office	Antrim	B+	B+	HB20/09/002	Upload Photo
Railway Bridge, Straidballymorris Dunadry		Bridge	Antrim	B+	B	HB20/12/011	Upload another image See more images
Crookedstone, 1 Ballyarnott Road, Aldergrove, Crumlin, Antrim BT29 4DT		House	Antrim	B+	B+	HB20/13/024	Upload Photo
Gartree C. of I. Church, Gartree, Largy Road, Crumlin		Church	Antrim	B+	B+	HB20/14/014	Upload Photo
Patterson's Spade Mill, 751 Antrim Road, Templepatrick BT39 0AP		Mill	Newtownabbey	B+	B+	HB21/01/005	Upload another image
Fisherwick Lodge 5 & 7 Mill Road, Doagh, Ballyclare BT39 0PQ		House	Newtownabbey	B+	B1	HB21/02/001	Upload Photo
Stephenson Mausoleum, Kilbride Cemetery, Moyra Road, Doagh BT39 0JD		Mausoleum	Newtownabbey	B+	B1	HB21/02/006	Upload Photo
Christ Church, Church Road, Ballynure, BT39 9AJ		Church	Newtownabbey	B+	B	HB21/03/001	Upload another image
Abbey House, Whiteabbey Hospital, Station Road, Newtownabbey BT37 9RH		Office	Newtownabbey	B+	B1	HB21/07/011	Upload another image
Railway Bridge, Glenville Road, Newtownabbey BT37		Bridge	Newtownabbey	B+		HB21/10/001 C	Upload another image
Railway Bridge, Glenville Road, Newtownabbey BT37		Bridge	Newtownabbey	B+		HB21/10/001 D	Upload Photo
Railway Bridge, Glenville Road, Newtownabbey BT37		Bridge	Newtownabbey	B+		HB21/10/001 E	Upload Photo
The Smythe Cross and Railings, Carnmoney Churchyard, Church Road, Newtownabbey		Memorial	Newtownabbey		B+	HB21/16/002	Upload Photo
Blackhead Lighthouse, McCrea's Brae, Whitehead BT38 9NZ		Light House/ Navigation Mark	Carrickfergus	B+		HB22/05/005 A	Upload another image See more images
Former Lighthouse Keepers Houses at Blackhead Lighthouse, McCrea's Brae, Whitehead BT38 9NZ		House	Carrickfergus	B+		HB22/05/005 B	Upload another image
Former Superintendent's House at Blackhead Lighthouse, McCrea's Brae, Whitehead BT38 9NZ		House	Carrickfergus	B+		HB22/05/005 C	Upload Photo
Seapark House, 109 Shore Road, Greenisland, Carrickfergus BT38 8TZ		House	Carrickfergus	B+	B1	HB22/07/011 A	Upload Photo
Carrickfergus Borough Council Town Hall, Joymount, Carrickfergus BT38 7DL		Town Hall	Carrickfergus	B+	B+	HB22/08/008	Upload another image See more images
7-27 Shiels Houses, Larne Road, Carrickfergus BT38 7EA		House - Terrace	Carrickfergus	B+	B1	HB22/14/001 A	Upload Photo
King's Bridge, Stranmillis Embankment, Belfast		Bridge	Belfast		B+	HB26/02/009	Upload another image See more images
Elmgrove Primary School, Beersbridge Road, Belfast		School	Belfast		B+	HB26/05/002	Upload Photo
179 - 187 Albertbridge Road, Belfast		Shop	Belfast		B+	HB26/06/005	Upload Photo
Lismachan House, 378 Belmont Road, Belfast		House	Belfast		B+	HB26/12/002	Upload Photo
Ulster Volunteer Hospital, Craigavon Somme Hospital Circular Road, Strandtown, Belfast		Hospital	Belfast		B+	HB26/12/025	Upload Photo
Gate Lodge, Stormont Estate, Massey Avenue, Belfast		Gates/ Screens/ Lodges	Belfast		B+	HB26/13/021	Upload another image
Parliament Buildings, Stormont Estate, Upper Newtownard Road		Parliament building	Belfast		B+	HB26/13/013	Upload another image See more images
Stormont Castle, Stormont Estate, Upper Newtownards Road, Belfast		Office	Belfast		B+	HB26/13/014	Upload another image See more images
Gate Lodge, Gates and Screen, Stormont Estate, Upper Newtownards Road, Belfast		Gates/ Screens/ Lodges	Belfast		B+	HB26/13/020	Upload another image
St. Molua's C of I Church, Upper Newtownards Road, Belfast		Church	Belfast		B+	HB26/13/031	Upload another image
STRANDTOWN PRIMARY SCHOOL NORTH ROAD SYDENHAM, Belfast		School	Belfast		B+	HB26/14/012	Upload Photo
ST. POLYCARP'S C OF I CHURCH UPPER LISBURN ROAD, Belfast		CHURCH	Belfast		B+	HB26/15/008	Upload Photo
DANESFORT 120 MALONE ROAD, Belfast		House	Belfast		B+	HB26/17/002	Upload Photo
HENRY GARRETT BUILDING STRANMILLIS COLLEGE STRANMILLIS ROAD, Belfast		College Building	Belfast		B+	HB26/17/052	Upload another image
23 ADELAIDE PARK, Belfast		House	Belfast		B+	HB26/18/005	Upload Photo
46 MYRTLEFIELD PARK, Belfast		House	Belfast		B+	HB26/18/017	Upload Photo
Dominican Convent, Falls Road, Belfast		Convent	Belfast		B+	HB26/24/001	Upload another image
Crescent Arts Centre, 2 University Road, Belfast BT7 1NH		Gallery/ Museum	Belfast	B+	B1	HB26/27/016	Upload another image
7 Upper Crescent Belfast Co Antrim BT7 1NT		Office - Terrace	Belfast	B+	B1	HB26/27/028 A	Upload another image
9 Upper Crescent Belfast Co Antrim BT7 1NT		Office - Terrace	Belfast	B+	B1	HB26/27/028 C	Upload Photo
11 Upper Crescent Belfast Co Antrim BT7 1NT		Office - Terrace	Belfast	B+	B1	HB26/27/028 E	Upload Photo
13 Upper Crescent, Belfast, Co Antrim BT7 1NT		Office - Terrace	Belfast	B+	B1	HB26/27/028 G	Upload another image
16 Upper Crescent Belfast Co Antrim BT7 1NT		House - Terrace	Belfast	B+	B1	HB26/27/028 J	Upload another image
2-4 Mount Charles, Belfast		House	Belfast		B+	HB26/27/008	Upload another image
Kelvin Monument, Botanic Gardens Park, Belfast		Memorial	Belfast		B+	HB26/27/012	Upload another image
Fitzroy Presbyterian Church, University St., Belfast		Church	Belfast		B+	HB26/27/050	Upload another image See more images
Christian Science Church, 2-4 University Avenue, Belfast		Church	Belfast		B+	HB26/27/058	Upload another image See more images
Queens University of Belfast, South Wing Extension, Belfast		University Building	Belfast		B+	HB26/27/060	Upload another image
Whitla Hall, Queens University of Belfast, University Road, Belfast		Hall	Belfast		B+	HB26/27/067	Upload another image See more images
All Souls Non-Subscribing Presbyterian Church, Elmwood Avenue, Belfast		Church	Belfast		B+	HB26/28/044	Upload another image See more images
St. Thomas' Church, Eglantine Avenue, Belfast		Church	Belfast		B+	HB26/28/082 A	Upload Photo
St. Thomas' C OF I Rectory, Eglantine Avenue, Belfast		Rectory	Belfast		B+	HB26/28/082 B	Upload Photo
Whitehall Tobacco Works, Linfield Road, Belfast		Factory	Belfast		B+	HB26/29/017	Upload another image See more images
Presbyterian Church, May St., Belfast		Church	Belfast		B+	HB26/30/031 A	Upload another image
Presbyterian Church Hall, May St., Belfast		Hall	Belfast		B+	HB26/30/031 B	Upload Photo
Clonard Church, Clonard St., Belfast		Church	Belfast		B+	HB26/31/001 A	Upload Photo
Clonard Monastery, Clonard St., Belfast		Monastery	Belfast		B+	HB26/31/001 B	Upload another image See more images
Clonard Gardens, Gates and Railings, Clonard St., Belfast		Garden Features	Belfast		B+	HB26/31/001 C	Upload Photo
Convent of Sisters of Charity of St. Vincent de Paul (formerly Clonard House), Clonard Gardens, Belfast		Convent	Belfast		B+	HB26/31/002	Upload Photo
The Courthouse, Crumlin Road, Belfast BT14 6AL		Court House	Belfast	B+	B+	HB26/35/006	Upload another image See more images
Holy Cross Monastery and Church, Crumlin Road, Belfast		Monastery and Church	Belfast		B+	HB26/37/002	Upload another image
Home for the Blind, 26-30 Cliftonville Road, Belfast BT14 6JY		House	Belfast		B+	HB26/43/002	Upload Photo
34 Cliftonville Road, Belfast		House	Belfast		B+	HB26/43/003 A	Upload Photo
36 Cliftonville Road, Belfast		House	Belfast		B+	HB26/43/003 B	Upload Photo
St. Malachy's College, Antrim Road, Belfast		School	Belfast		B+	HB26/43/007	Upload another image
Chapel, St. Malachy's College, Antrim Road, Belfast		Church	Belfast		B+	HB26/43/007 A	Upload another image
Duncairn Presbyterian Church (Deconsecrated) Antrim Road, Belfast		Church	Belfast		B+	HB26/43/008	Upload Photo
St. Peter's Church of Ireland Church, Antrim Road, Belfast		Church	Belfast		B+	HB26/46/015	Upload Photo
Walls at Burying Ground, Henry Place (off Clifton St.), Belfast		Graveyard	Belfast		B+	HB26/49/005	Upload Photo
College of Technology, College Square, East Belfast BT1 6DJ		College Building	Belfast	B+		HB26/50/222	Upload another image
Warehouse at 42 Waring Street ('Cotton Court'), Belfast BT1 2ED		Warehouse	Belfast	B+		HB26/50/278	Upload Photo
Clarence Place Hall 10 May St., Belfast		Hall	Belfast		B+	HB26/50/020	Upload Photo
St. Patrick's R.C. Church, Donegall St., Belfast		Church	Belfast		B+	HB26/50/077	Upload another image See more images
Donegall Square Methodist Church, Donegall Square East, Belfast		Bank	Belfast		B+	HB26/50/019	Upload another image
Cleaver House, 56 Donegall Place/Donegall Square North, Belfast		Shop	Belfast		B+	HB26/50/014	Upload another image See more images
Christ Church and Railings, College Square North, Belfast		Church	Belfast		B+	HB26/50/025	Upload Photo
McCausland's Building (Hotel), 34-38 Victoria Street, Belfast	54°36′00″N 5°55′27″W	Office	Belfast	–	A	HB26/50/046	Upload another image See more images
Albert Memorial Clock, Victoria Street, Belfast		Clock Tower	Belfast		B+	HB26/50/055	Upload another image See more images
Trustee Savings Bank, Queen's Square, Belfast		Bank	Belfast		B+	HB26/50/056	Upload another image
Northern Whig Building, Bridge St., Belfast		Office	Belfast		B+	HB26/50/060	Upload another image
Queen's Bridge, Belfast		Bridge	Belfast		B+	HB26/50/078	Upload Photo
Carlisle Memorial Methodist Church, Carlisle Circus, Belfast		Church	Belfast		B+	HB26/50/091 A	Upload another image
The Former Carlisle Memorial Church Hall (Indian Community Centre), 86 Clifton St., Belfast		Office	Belfast		B+	HB26/50/091 B	Upload another image
Sinclair Seaman's Presbyterian Church, Corporation Square, Belfast		Church	Belfast		B+	HB26/50/093	Upload another image
Presbyterian Church, Townsend St., Belfast		Church	Belfast		B+	HB26/50/169	Upload Photo
Sinclair House, 89-101 Royal Avenue and 92-102 North St. Belfast		Shop	Belfast		B+	HB26/50/186	Upload another image
Bank of Ireland, Royal Avenue, Belfast		Bank	Belfast		B+	HB26/50/187	Upload another image See more images
Belfast Castle, Antrim Road, Belfast		Country House	Belfast		B+	HB26/51/001A	Upload another image See more images
Chapel of the Resurrection, Innisfayle Park, Antrim Road, Belfast		Church	Belfast		B+	HB26/51/002	Upload another image
Graymount House, Cedar Lodge School (Hazelwood College), Gray's Lane, Belfast		House	Belfast		B+	HB26/51/006	Upload Photo
St. Bernadette's R.C. Church, 113 Rosetta Road, Belfast BT6 0LS		Church	Castlereagh	B+		HB25/12/001	Upload Photo
Castlereagh Presbyterian Church, 79 Church Road, Castlereagh, Belfast BT6 9SA		Church	Castlereagh	B+	B	HB25/13/002	Upload another image
Seaport Lodge, Portballintrae, Bushmills		House	Coleraine		B+	HB03/05/002	Upload Photo
Ballywatt Presbyterian Church, Ballywatt Leggs, Coleraine		Church	Coleraine		B+	HB03/05/015	Upload Photo
Holy Trinity Parish Church, Main St., Portrush		Church	Coleraine		B+	HB03/10/017	Upload another image See more images

== See also ==
- List of Grade A listed buildings in County Antrim
