= St Comgall's Church =

Church in County Antrim

Saint Comgall's Church
- 'Black Chapel'
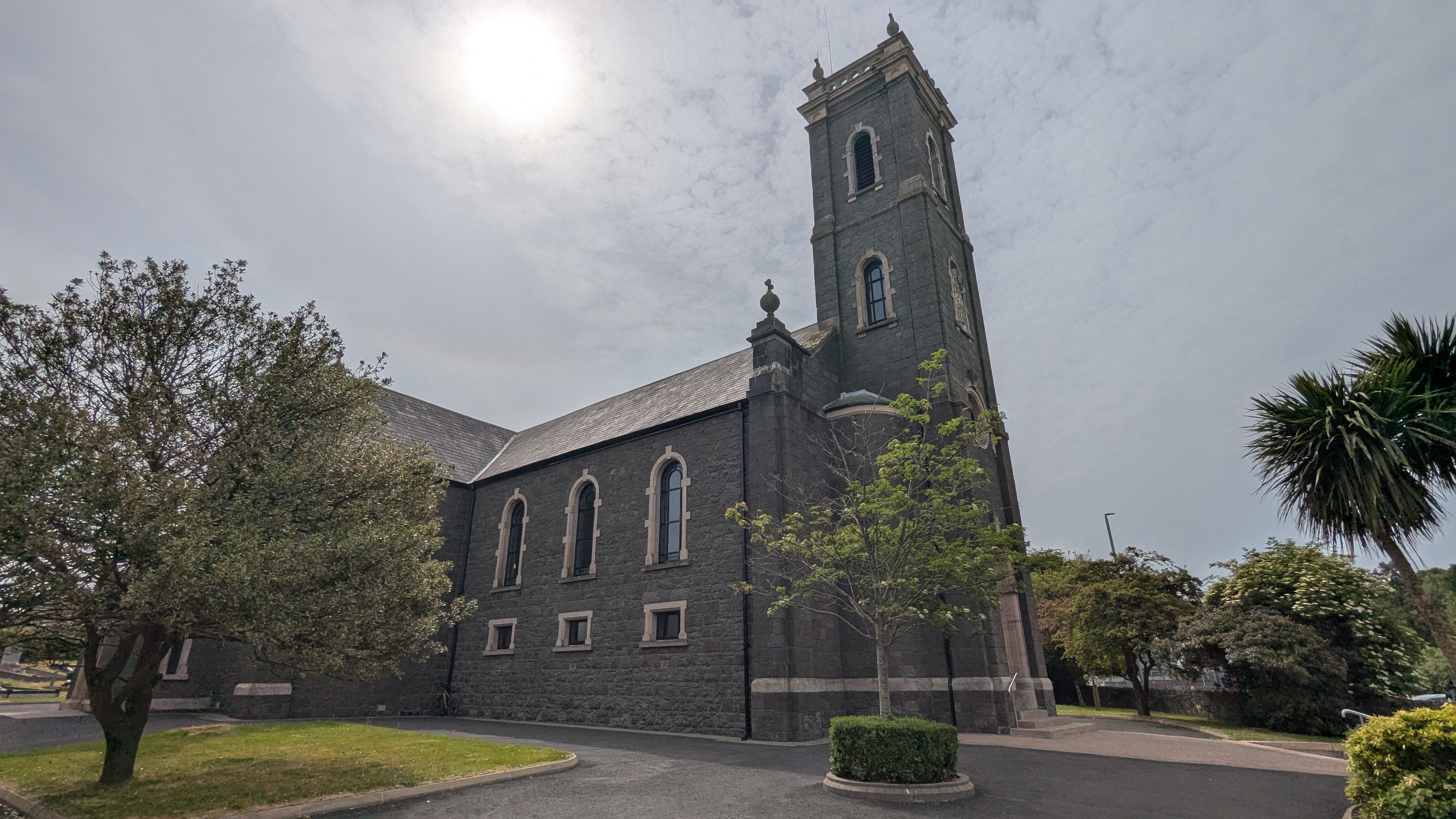
- St Comgall's in May 2025
- Saint Comgall's Church
- 54.7192°N 6.2200°W
- Location: Antrim, County Antrim
- Address: 8 Castle St, Antrim BT41 4JE
- Country: Northern Ireland, United Kingdom
- Denomination: Latin Church
- Tradition: Roman Rite
- Website: www.antrimparish.com

History
- Consecrated: 30 October 1870

Architecture
- Heritage designation: B+
- Architect: James O'Connor
- Style: Baroque
- Groundbreaking: 1860s
- Completed: October 1870
- Construction cost: £9,000 (£877,221 as of 2025)

Specifications
- Capacity: 525
- Materials: Basalt; Scrabo Sandstone

Administration
- Diocese: Down and Connor
- Parish: Antrim

St Comgall's Church in Antrim, County Antrim, Northern Ireland is a Roman Catholic church, in the parish of Antrim within the Roman Catholic Diocese of Down and Connor. The church is dedicated to St Comgall. It is known locally as the 'Black Chapel' due to its naturally dark stone, though this has faded over time. The church is a listed building.

== History ==
=== First church (1818–1859) ===
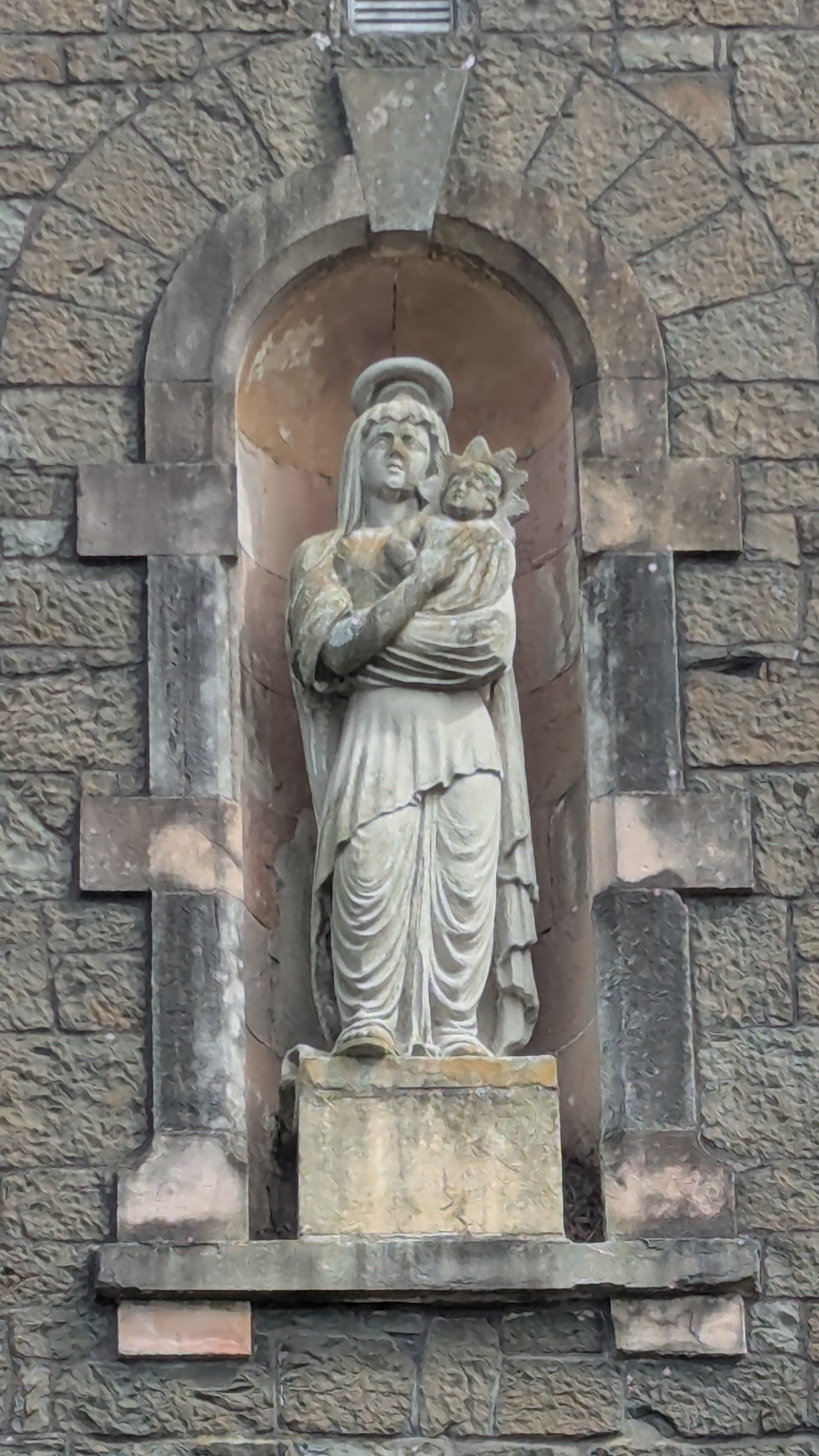
Statue of the Virgin Mary, from the 1818 church

The current church is the second to exist on the site. The first was built from 1818 to 1820, and originally called the "Church of Antrim", not St Comgall's. Funds were raised in 1817 to build a new church in the town by the Rev. Bernard McCann, Curate (CC) of Drummaul. £1400 (£103,376, as of 2025) was spent to build the first church. A Sunday school was attended by 174 children: 105 boys and 68 girls. When the first church opened it only had 60 seat holders. Pew no. 27 was bought by Lord Massereene for the use of his servants. Those who were not seat holders had to stand and observe Mass. It accommodated 600 churchgoers. A statue of the Blessed Virgin Mary is the only surviving object of the 1818 church, this statue now sits in a niche overlooking the adjoining graveyard.

=== Current church (1860–present) ===
In the 1860s Fr. O'Loughlin, Parish Priest (PP) of Drummaul and Antrim, began the work of building a new church, the site was planned to be at the "station junction and craigstown roads" near Randalstown, but the sub-landlord refused to sell the site. This act birthed an amazing feat conceived by Fr. O'Loughlin to build the new church around the pre-existing one. The old church was left intact until construction reached its roof height, the old church was dismantled and moved brick-by-brick through the door of the new church (St Comgall's). Left over bricks, from St Comgall's, were moved to railway street and used to build the Protestant Hall, now an Orange Hall.

In 1873 the Parish of Antrim was formed, breaking away from Drummaul.

Fr. Davey, PP 1935–1970, was told that covering the church in linseed oil would help to preserve the church's black stone, so the church was covered in the oil in an effort to preserve the colour of the stone. The oil coat sealed the stone, so much that trapped moisture couldn't get out of the porous stone. Water began to damage the timber frame, and run down the walls inside, so in the 1970s the church was renovated, and the oil removed. The removal process contributed to the lightening of the stone as has weathering over time.

During the 1970s, renovations two permanent confessionals were built on either side of the sanctuary. There were added as extensions to the preexisting church building.

To mark 200 years of a Catholic church in Antrim town a book, written by the sacristan of St Comgall's, Brendan Smith, was published in 2018. The book, titled "Silent Night Holy Night - 200 Years of a Catholic Church in Antrim", details the history of the church, parish, the associated school and Gaelic Athletic Association club, and a history of Antrim town. It also covered the history of Christianity in the surrounding area.

== Church grounds ==
The church is part of a larger site consisting of a graveyard, parochial house, stables, and a parish hall. The main church, its gates and gate piers are included on the list of Grade B+ listed buildings in County Antrim.

=== Church layout ===
St Comgall's Church is a latin cross plan church. The nave hosts pews that lead into the crossing, before the altar. Within each transept is a confessional.

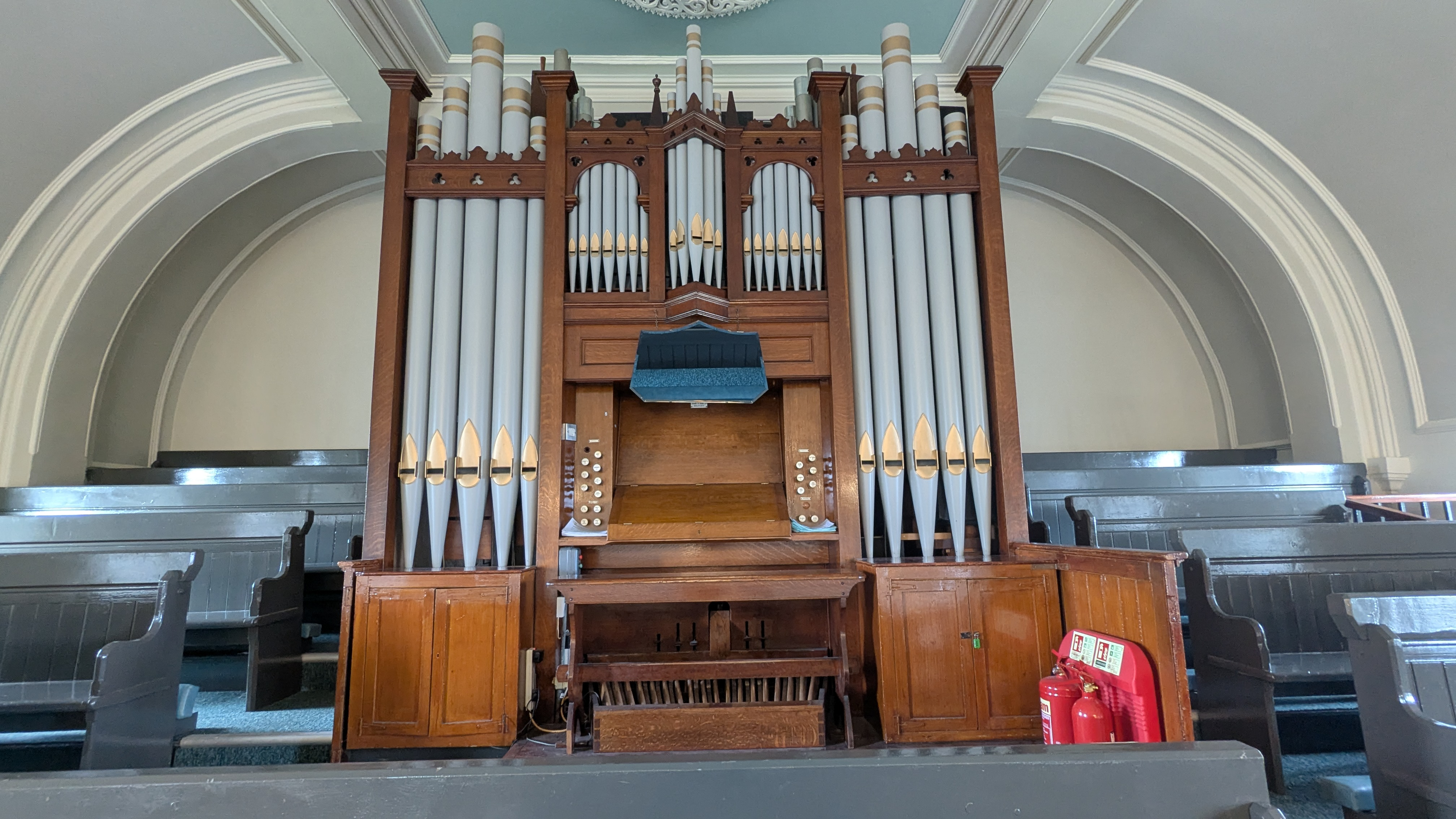
Organ, built by Evans and Barr of Belfast

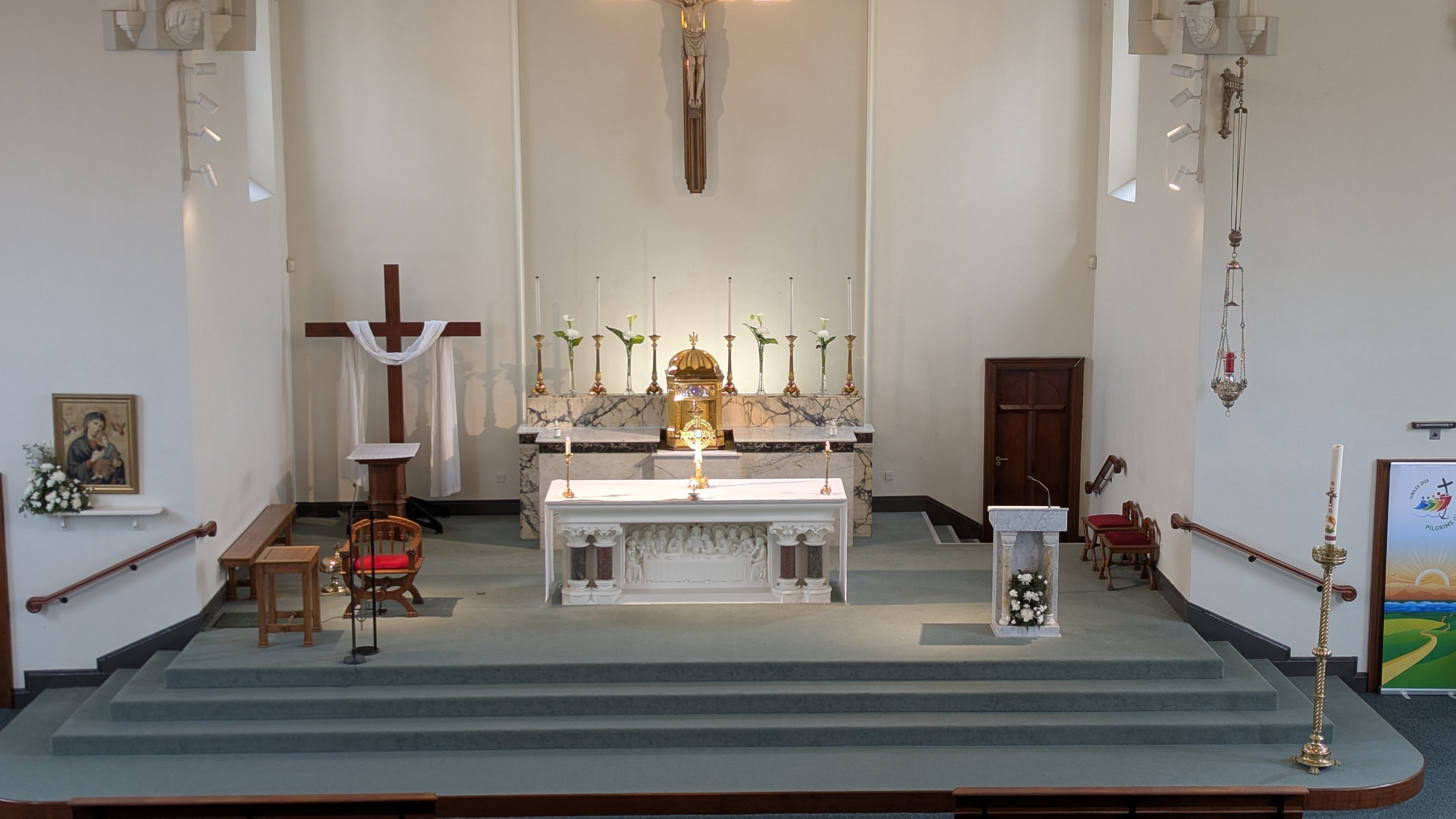
The sanctuary, displaying the Blessed Sacrament. In the wake of Easter (2025)

The sanctuary consists of a marble altar, which has a depiction Leonardo da Vinci's Last Supper. The altar also hold the relics of St Comgall.

The façade of the church features a tower which holds the bell. The bell no longer swings due to the age of the supporting structure, The bell tolls before each mass and each time at the Angelus.

In 1970 during renovations a crypt was discovered, just beneath the West door, it was built with the intention that Fr. Laughlin would be buried there, however he died, and was subsequently buried, in Boston, USA. The crypt is still there today.

The black basalt stone used for the construction of the church came from Hart's Quarry and the scrabo sandstone freestone from County Down.

Before renovations in the 1970s, busts of the 12 Apostles were supported by columns inside the church, now only four remain

=== Grounds ===
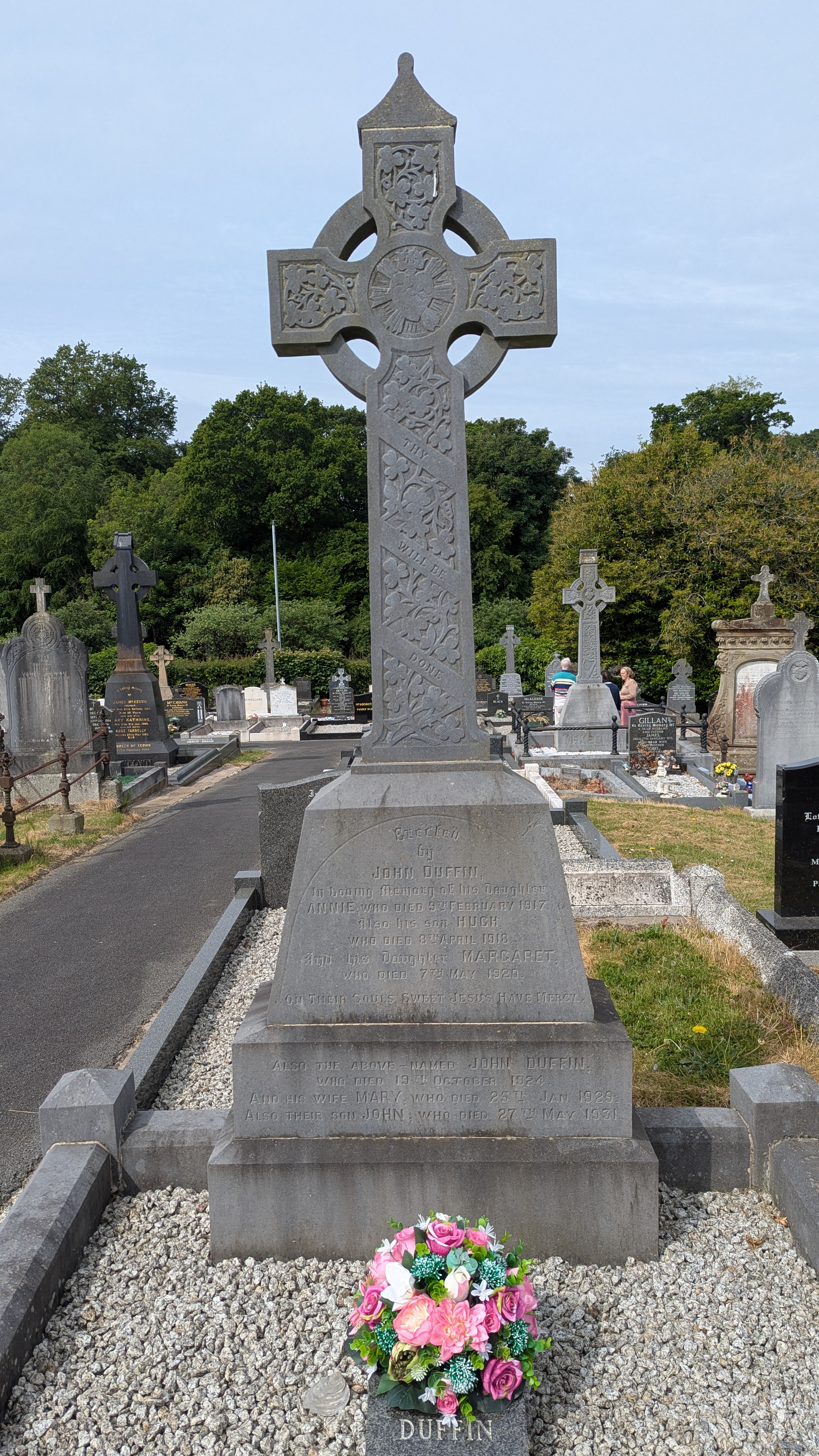
Grave of Pvt. Hugh Duffin, and family

The graveyard is on the churches South-side, to the right side of the façade. The graveyard contains a Commonwealth War Grave, belonging to a Private H. Duffin, who was killed in action at the Battle of the Lys. He belonged to the Royal Irish Regiment.

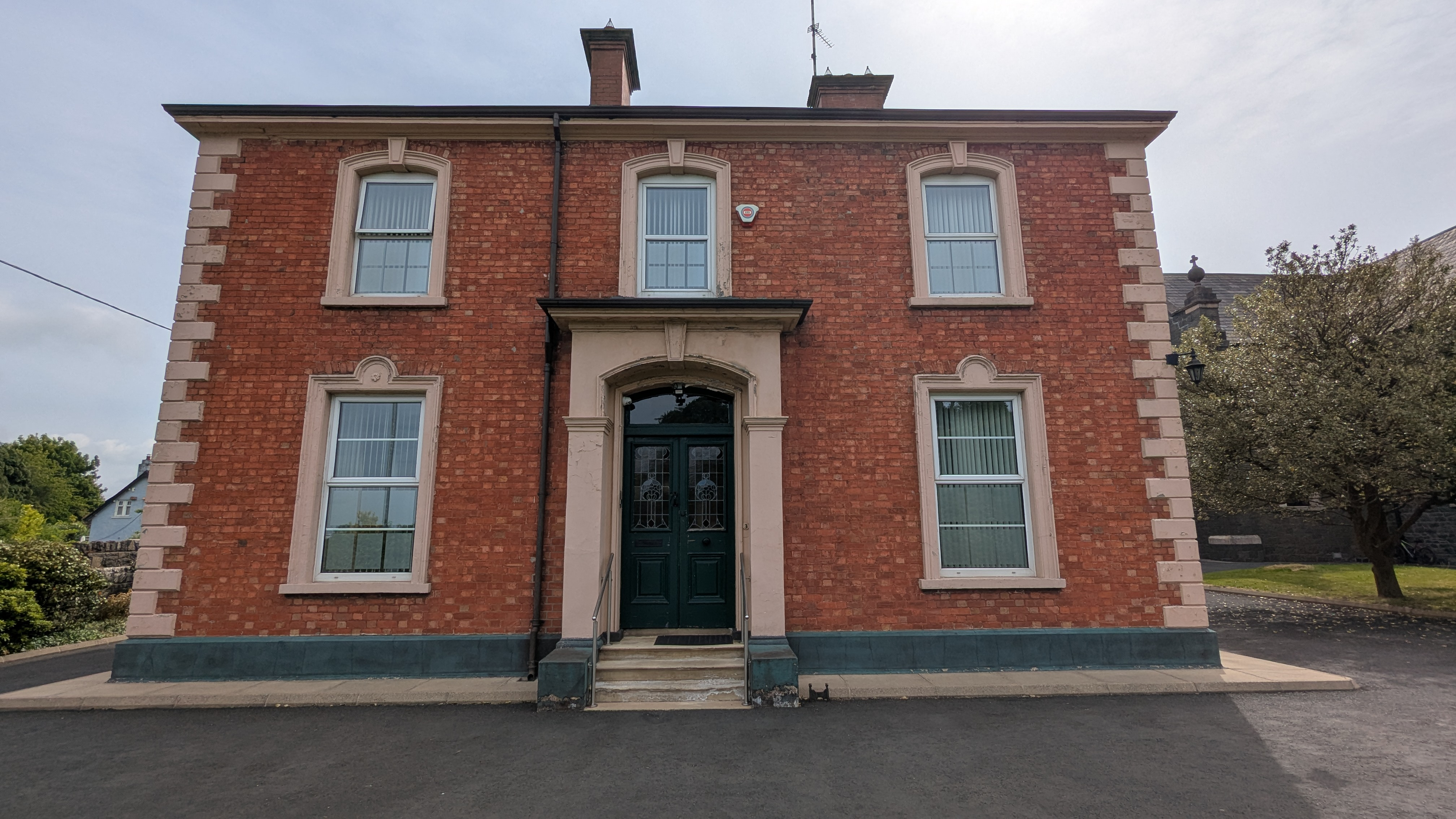
St Comgall's Parochial House

There has been a house on the site since at least 1818 as mentioned in an 1832 Ordnance Survey map, and in a 1862 valuation of the site. Fr. Loughlin, builder of the present church, also erected the current Parochial House in 1872.

In 1872 the stables were erected alongside the parochial house. The stables were used to keep the horses and carts belonging to the priests before motorcars. The stable's loft was used to film The Last Rifleman, a 2023 film shot in Antrim town. (Note: Referred to in the Antrim Guardian (March 2020) although other sources point to "The Last Rifleman" as the film in question. See Northernirelandscreen.co.uk - The Last Rifleman)

== Gallery ==
Images from around St Comgall's church grounds

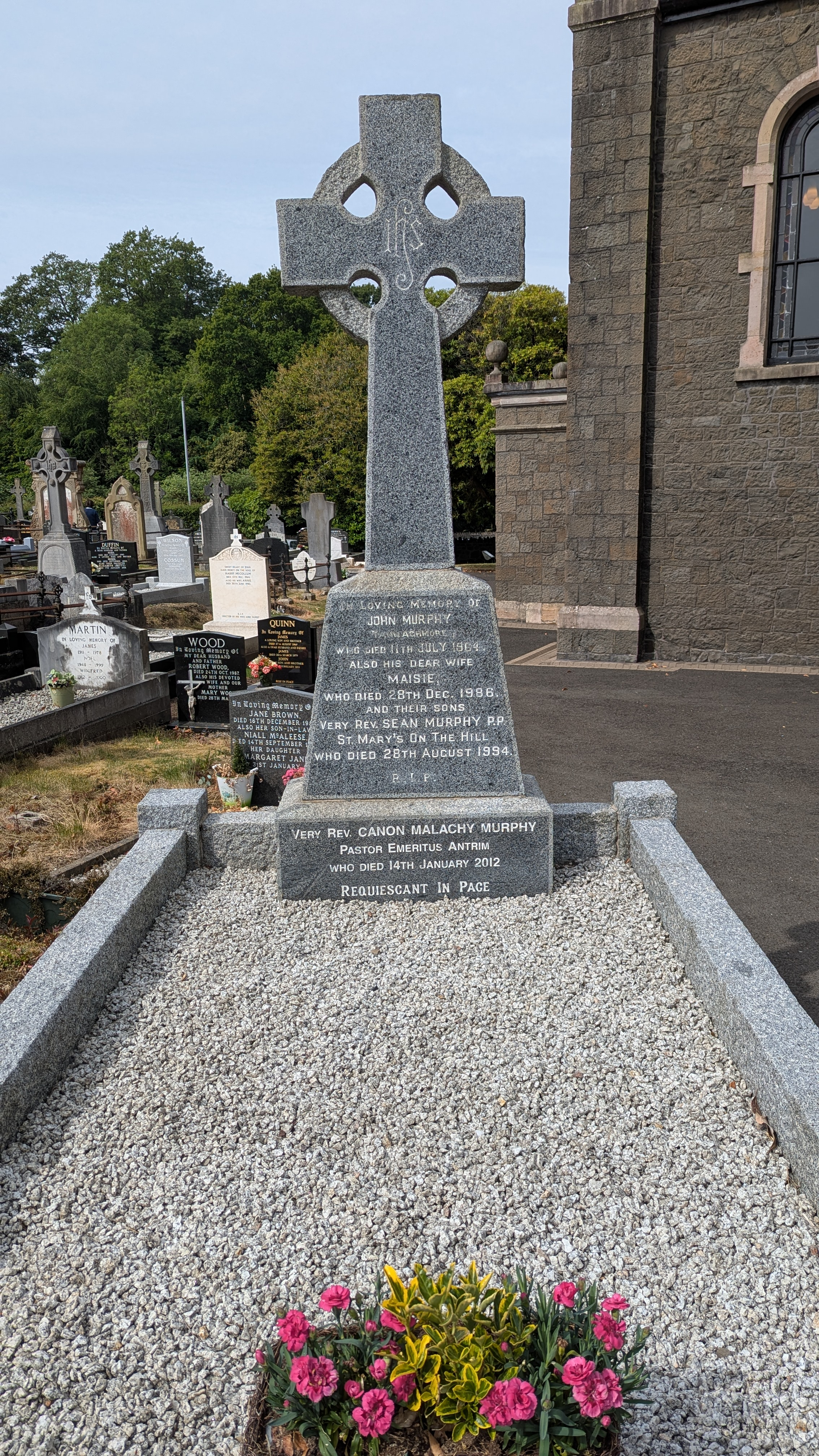
Grave of Fr. Murphy, Malachy. 'Pastor Emeritus'

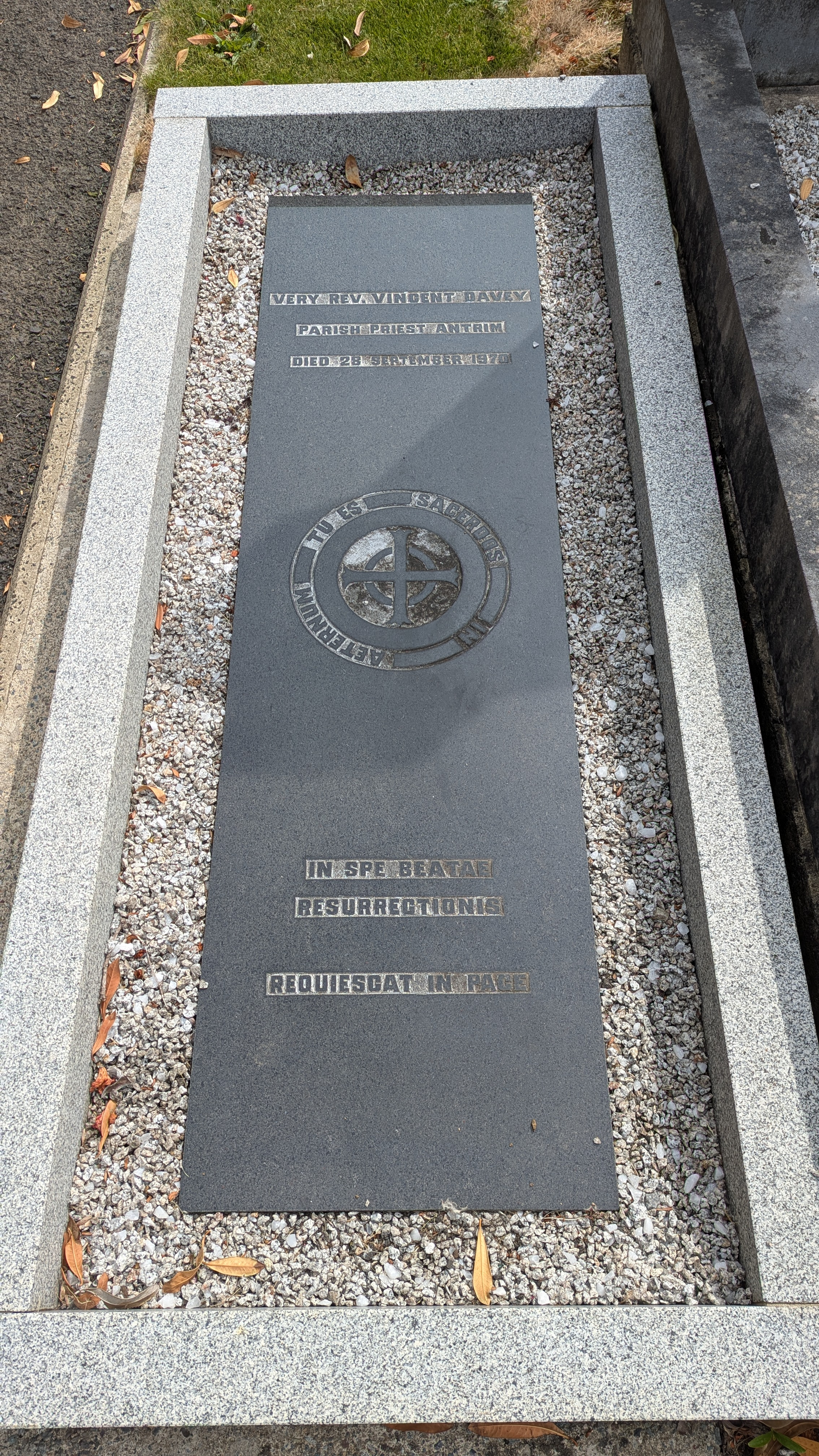
Grave of Fr. Davey, Vincent

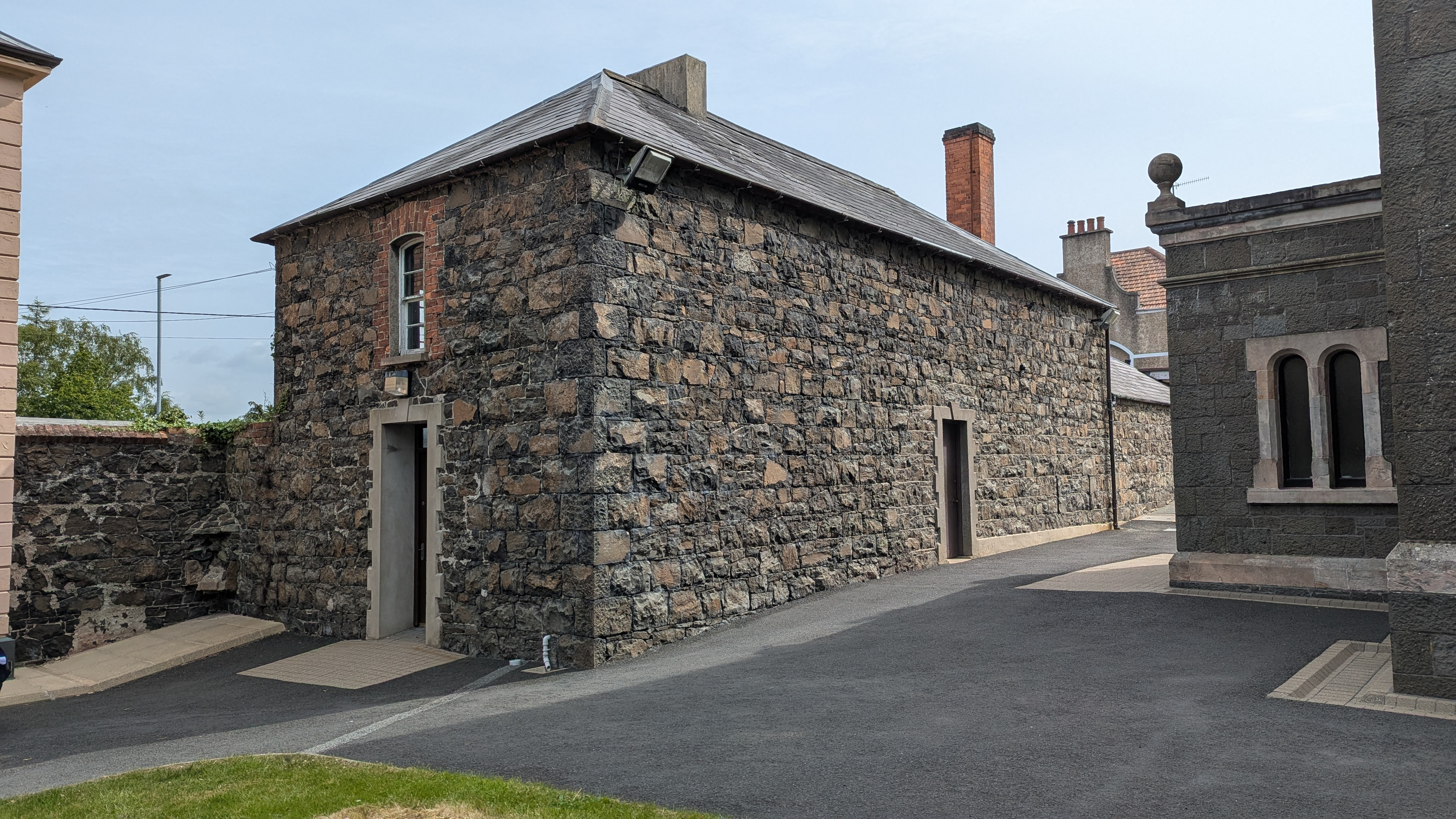
Stables, now no longer in use

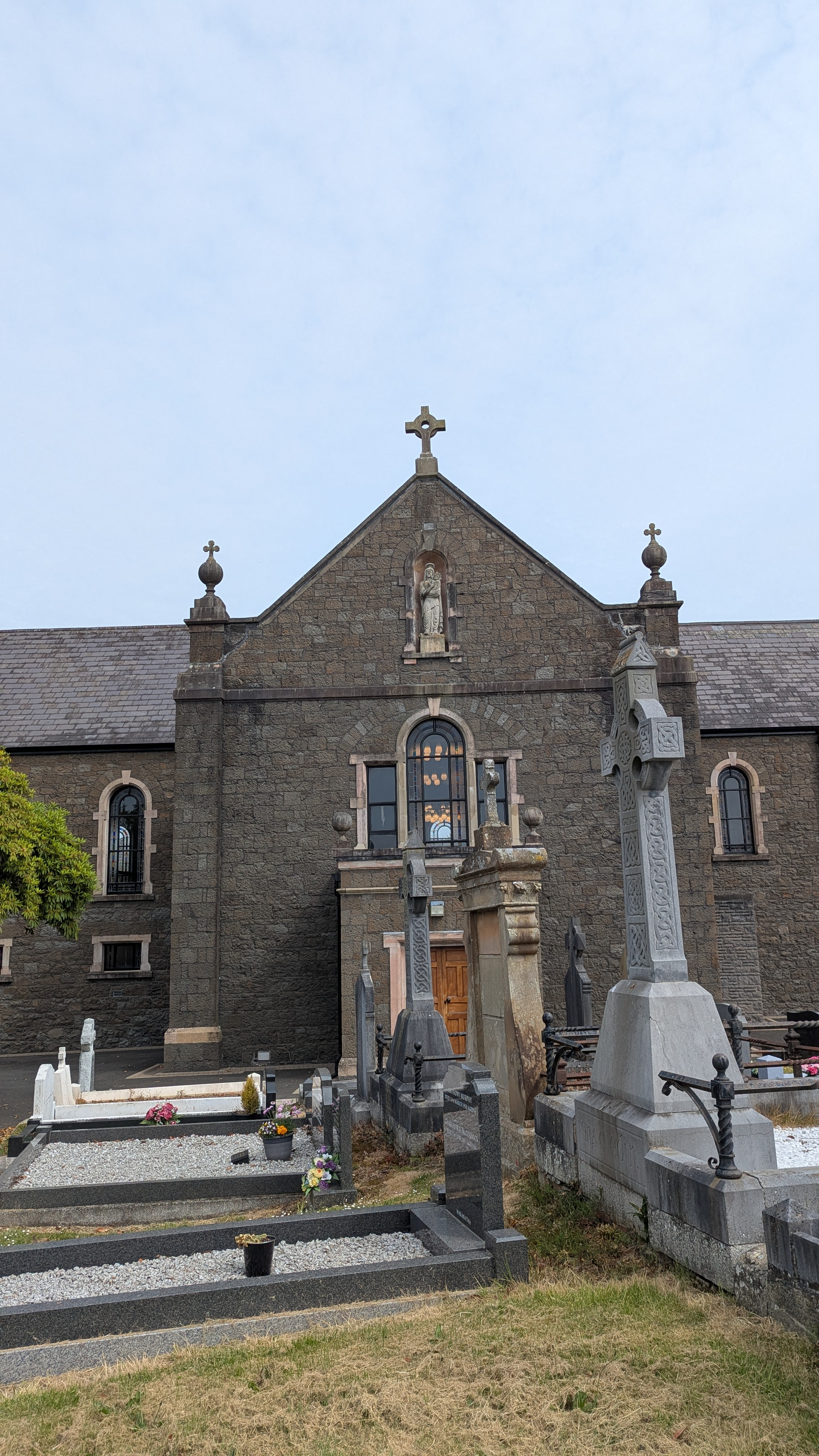
From the graveyard facing towards South transept

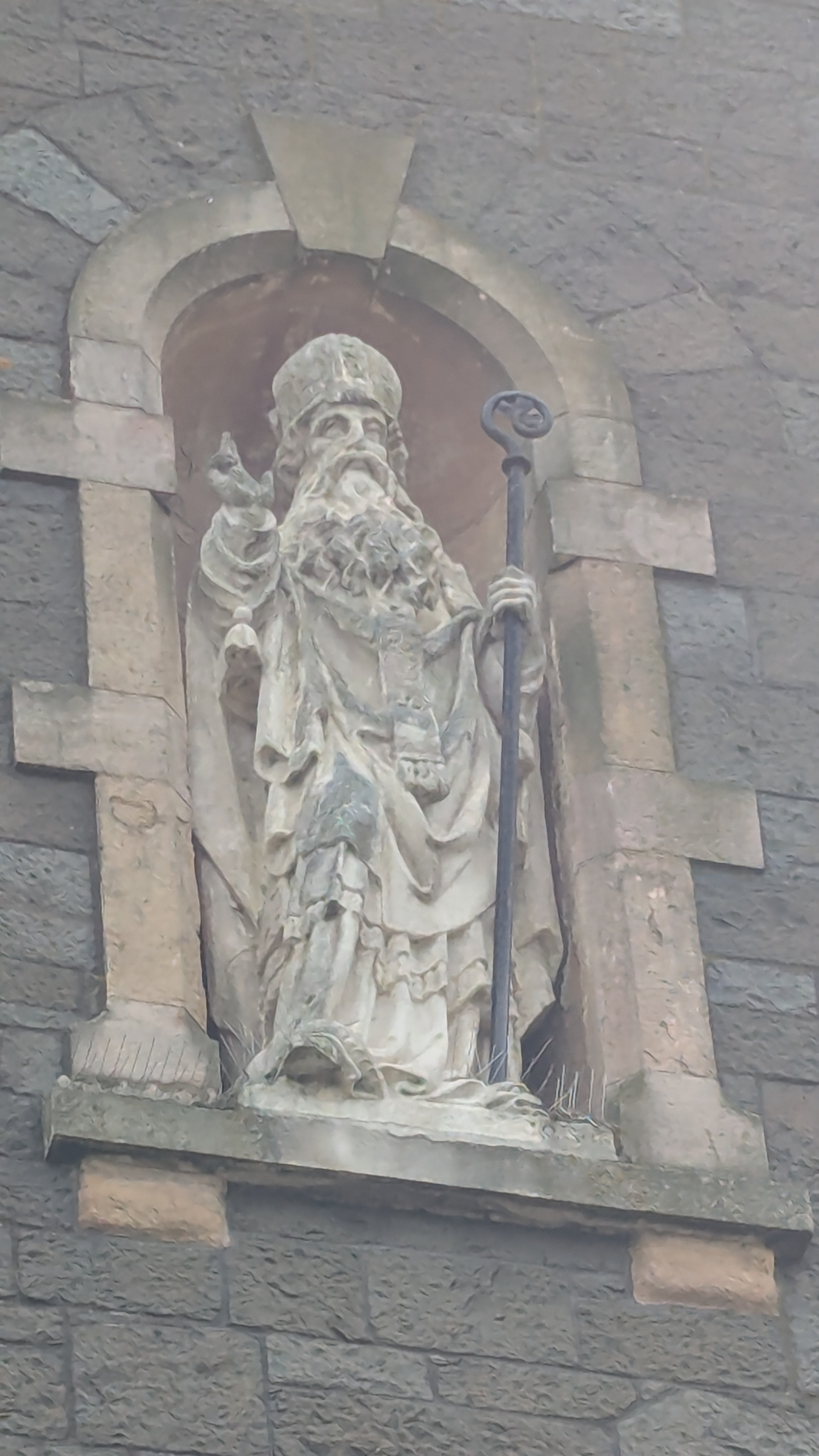
Statue of St Comgall facing West, above West door

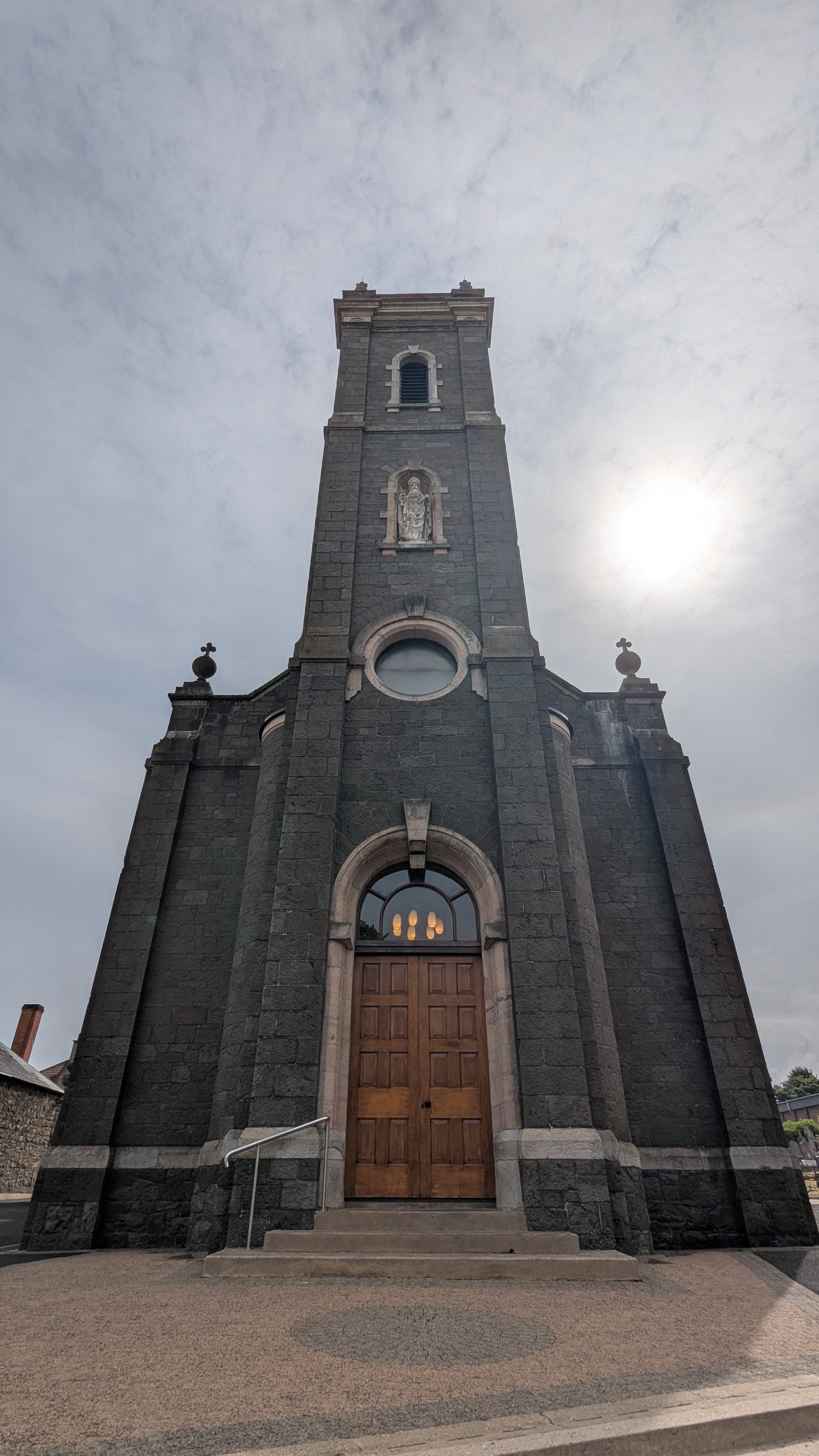
West Façade of the church

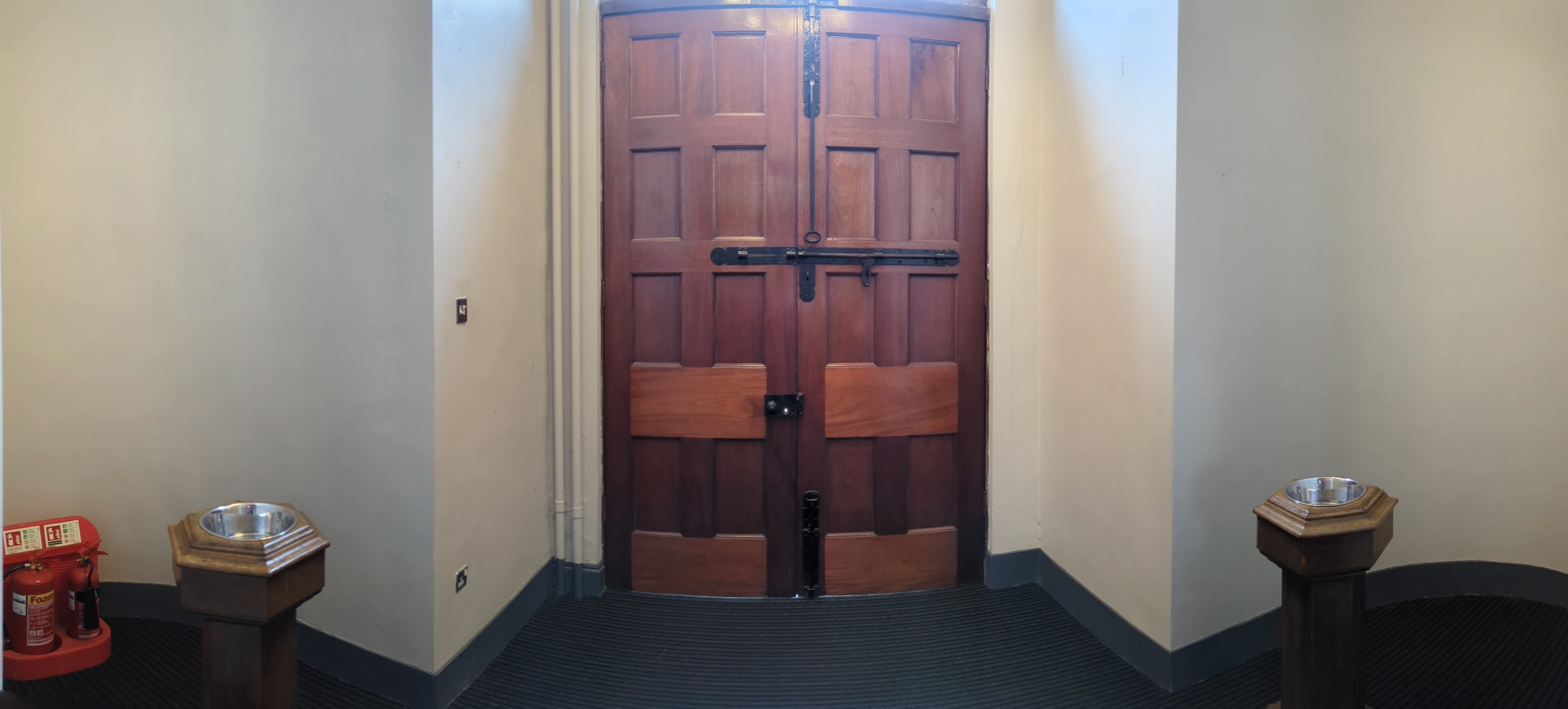
Vestibule, under which is the crypt

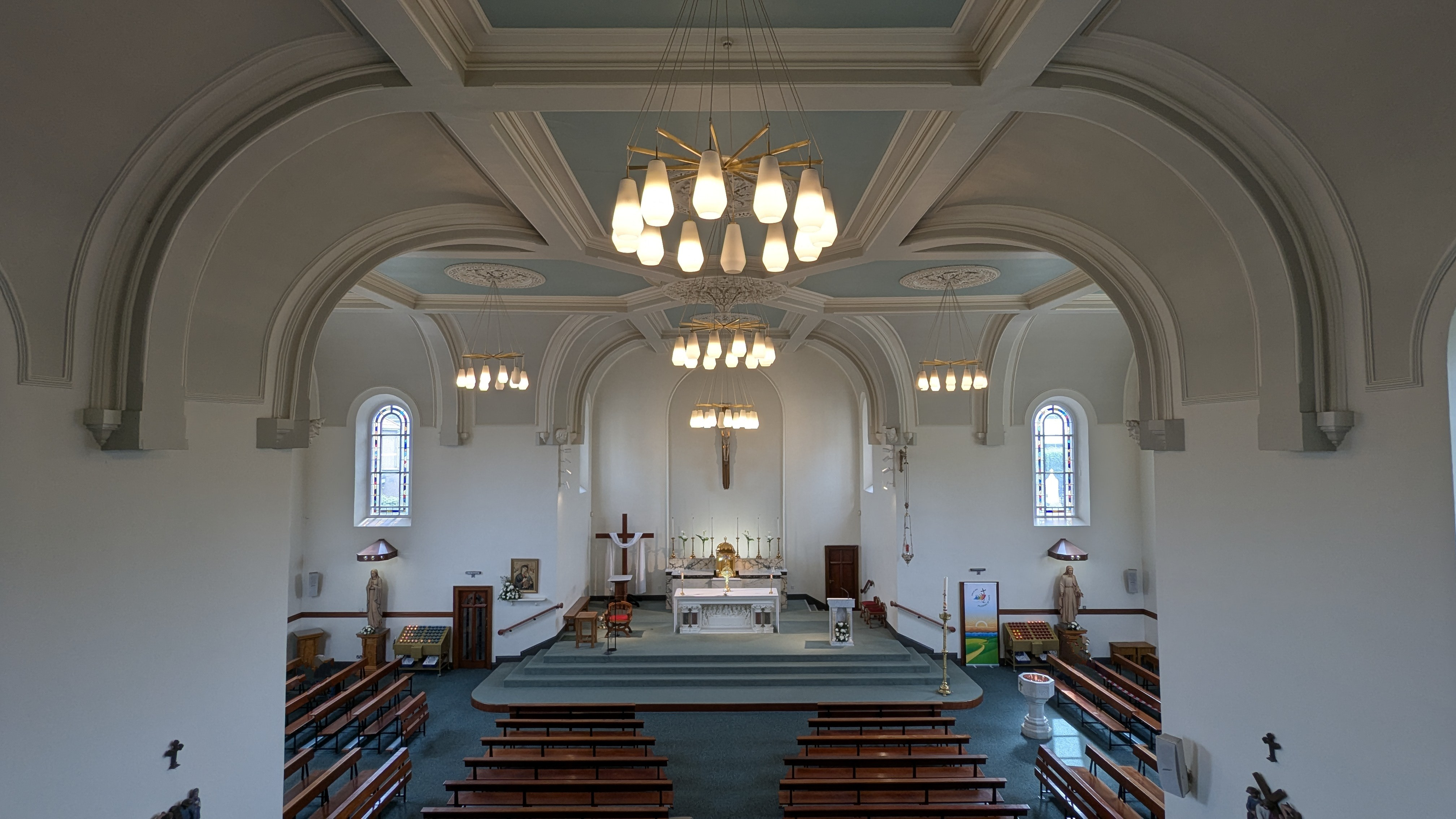
Interior of the church as viewed from the organ loft

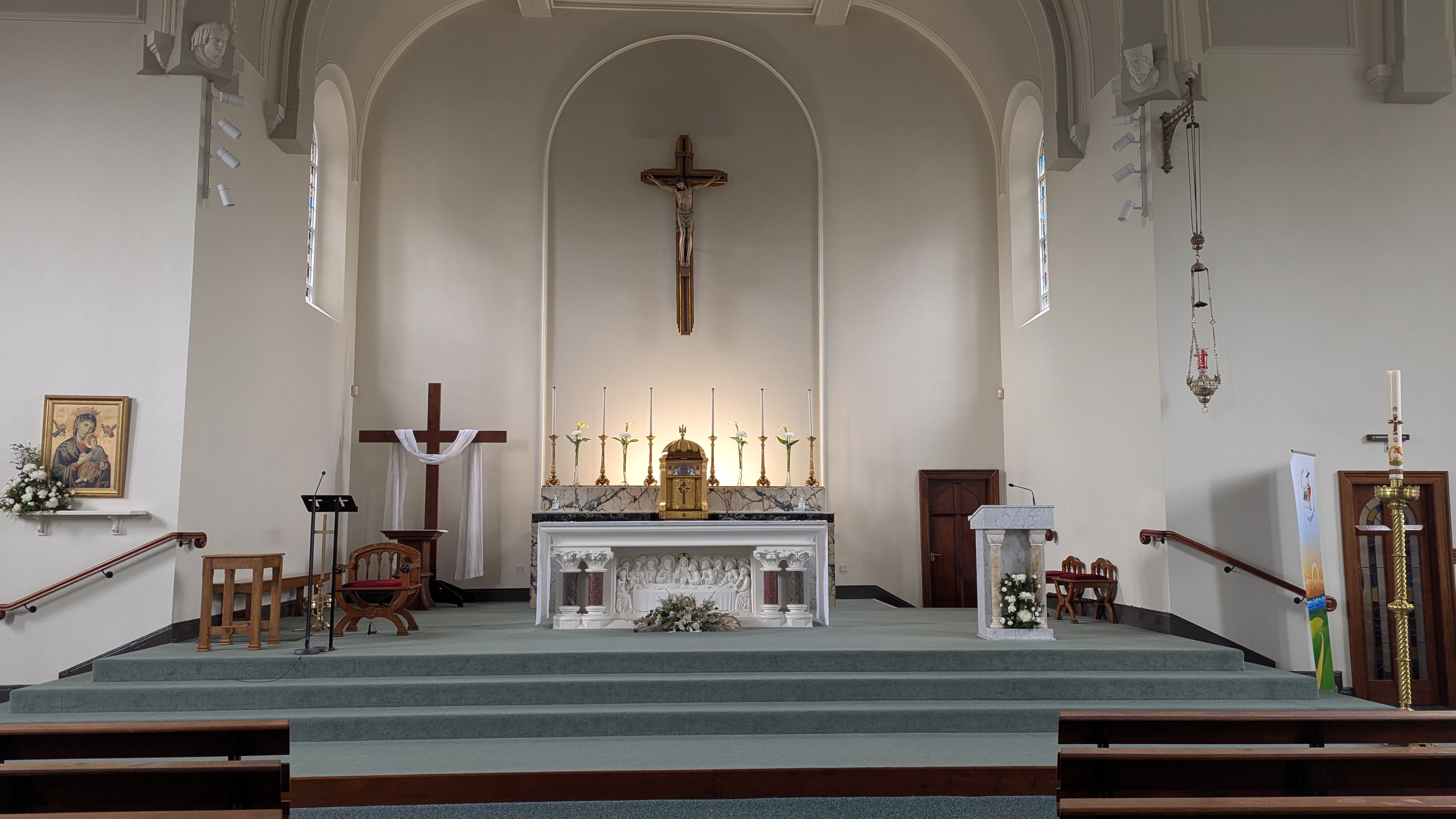
Sanctuary

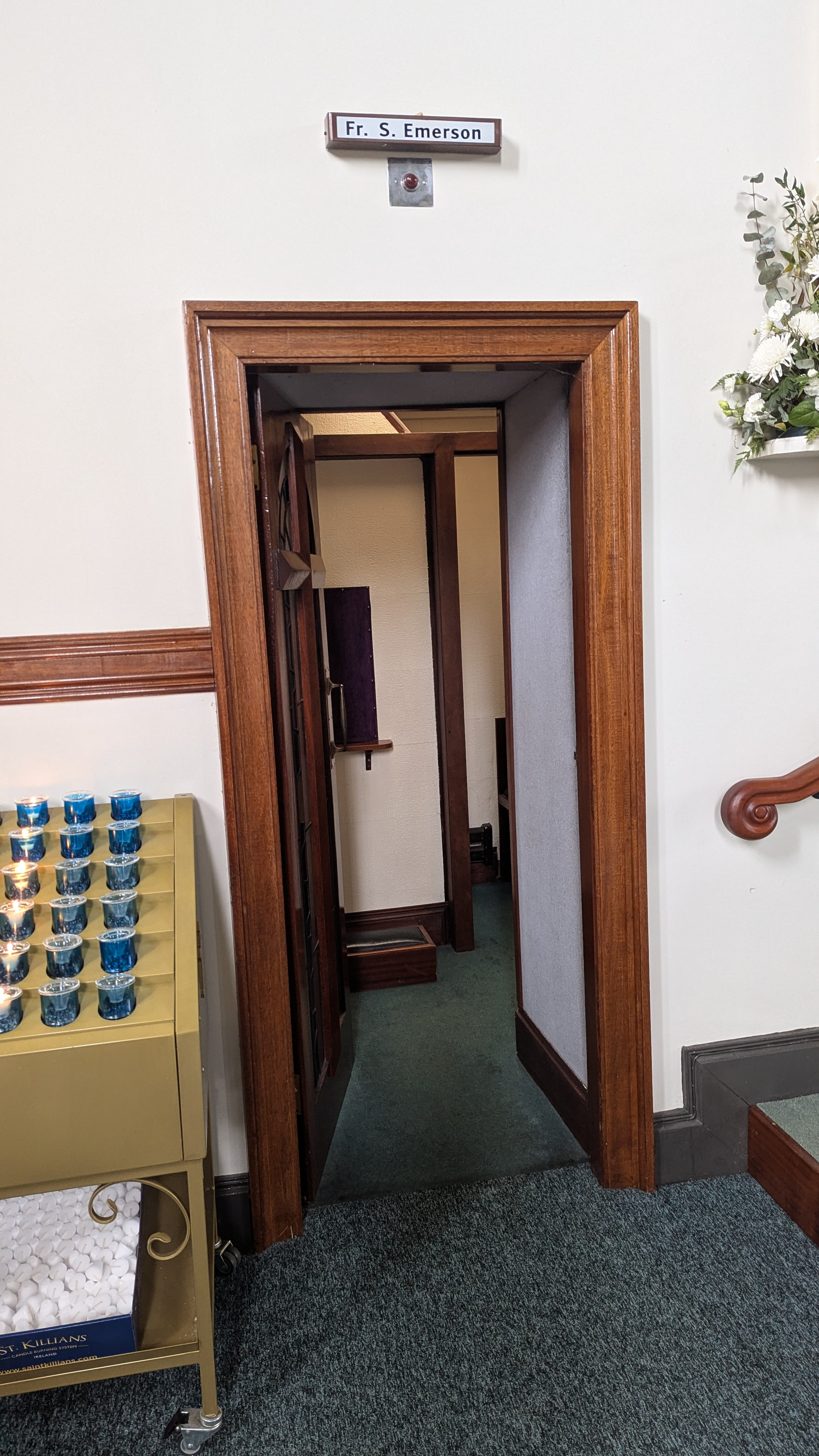
Confessional (North transept)

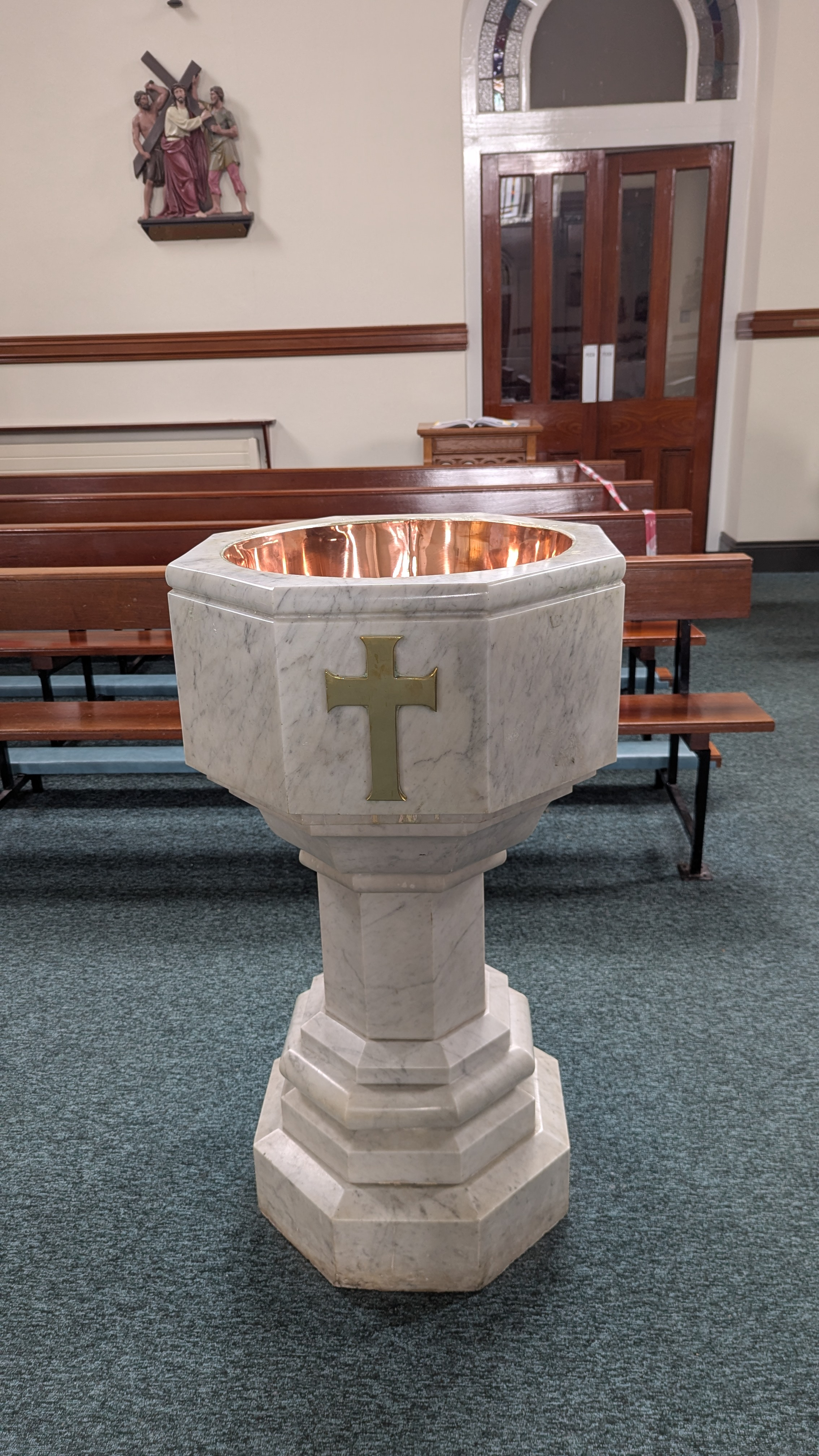
Baptismal font

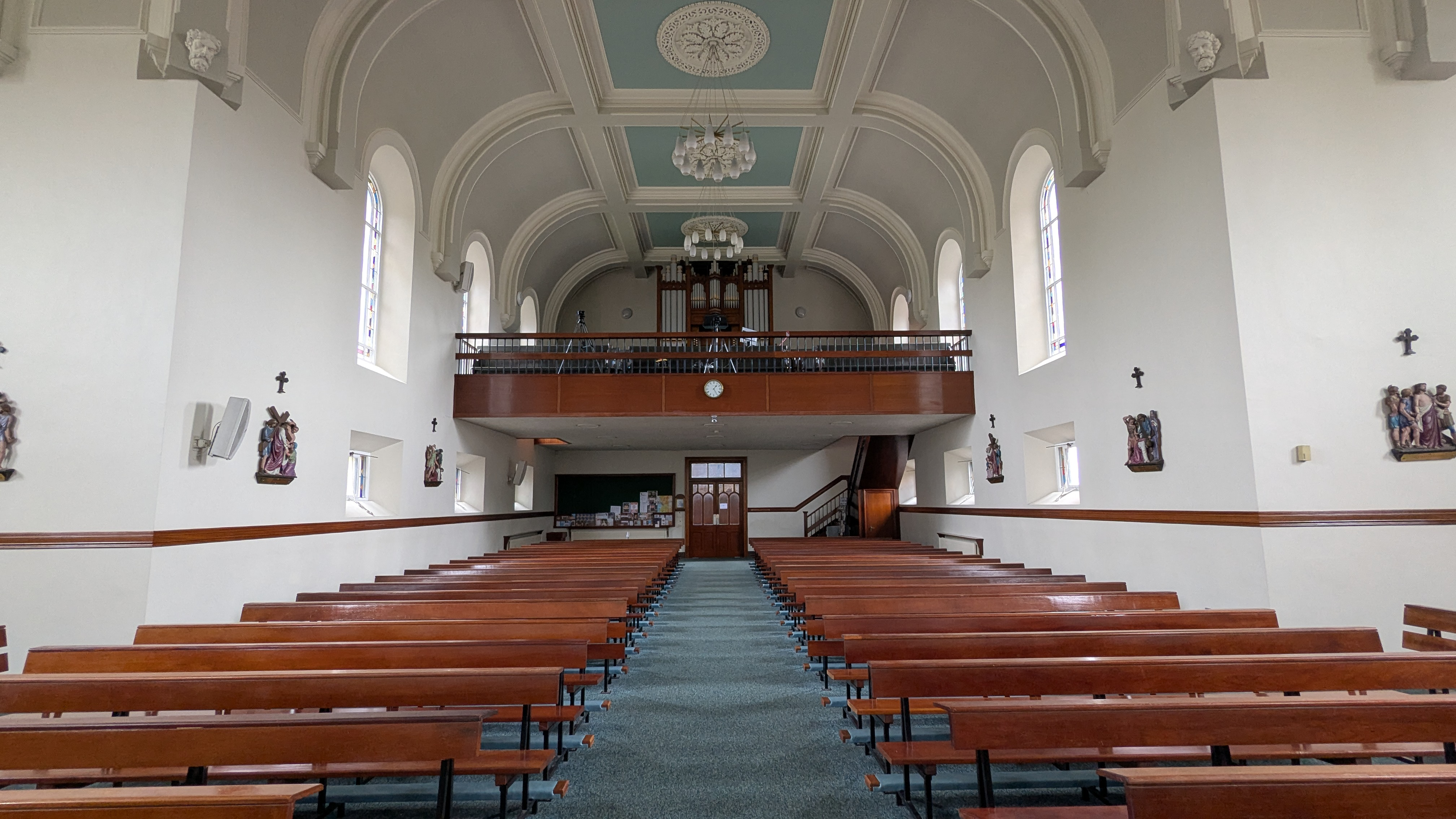
Nave (away from Sanctuary)

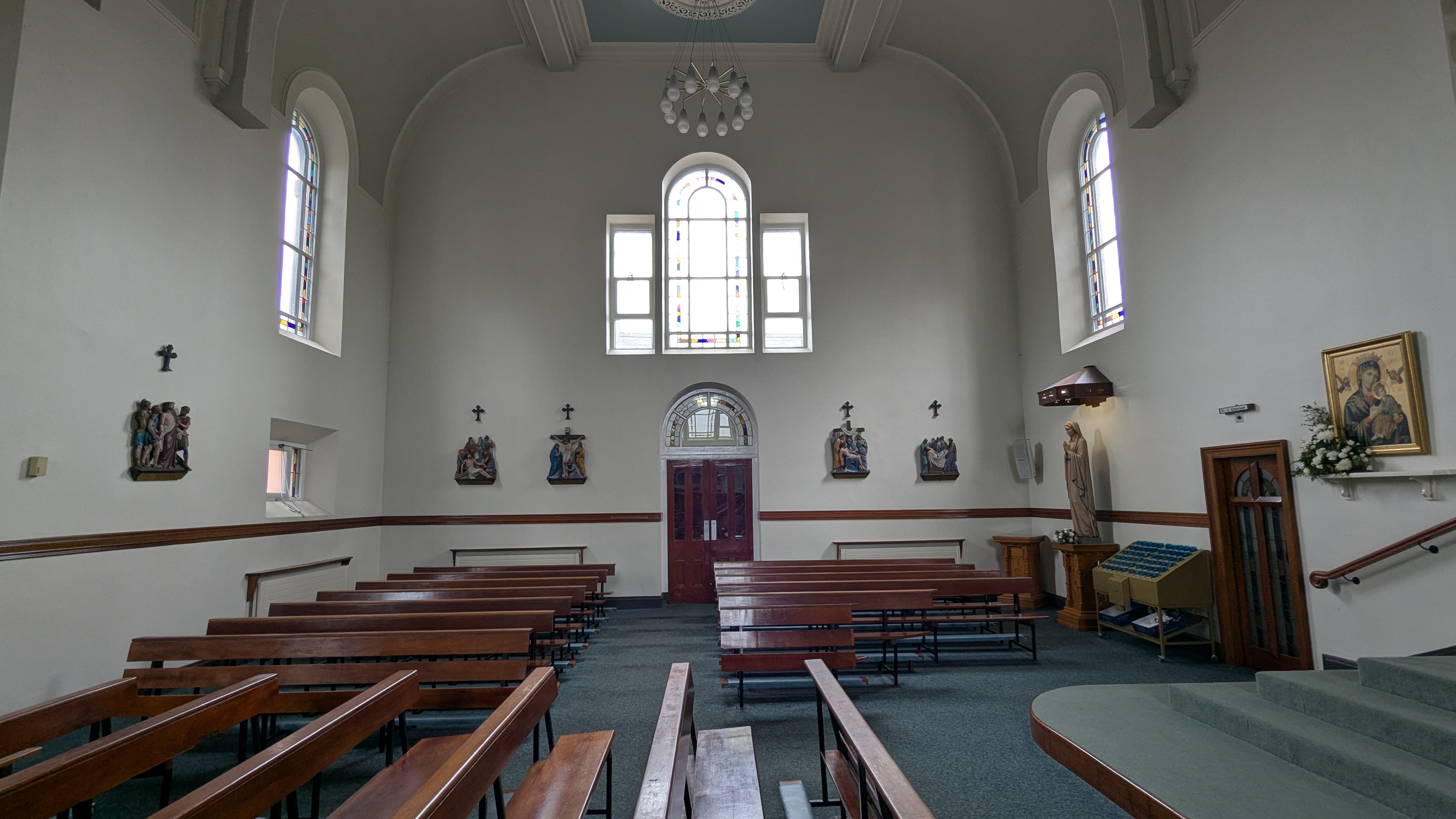
North transept

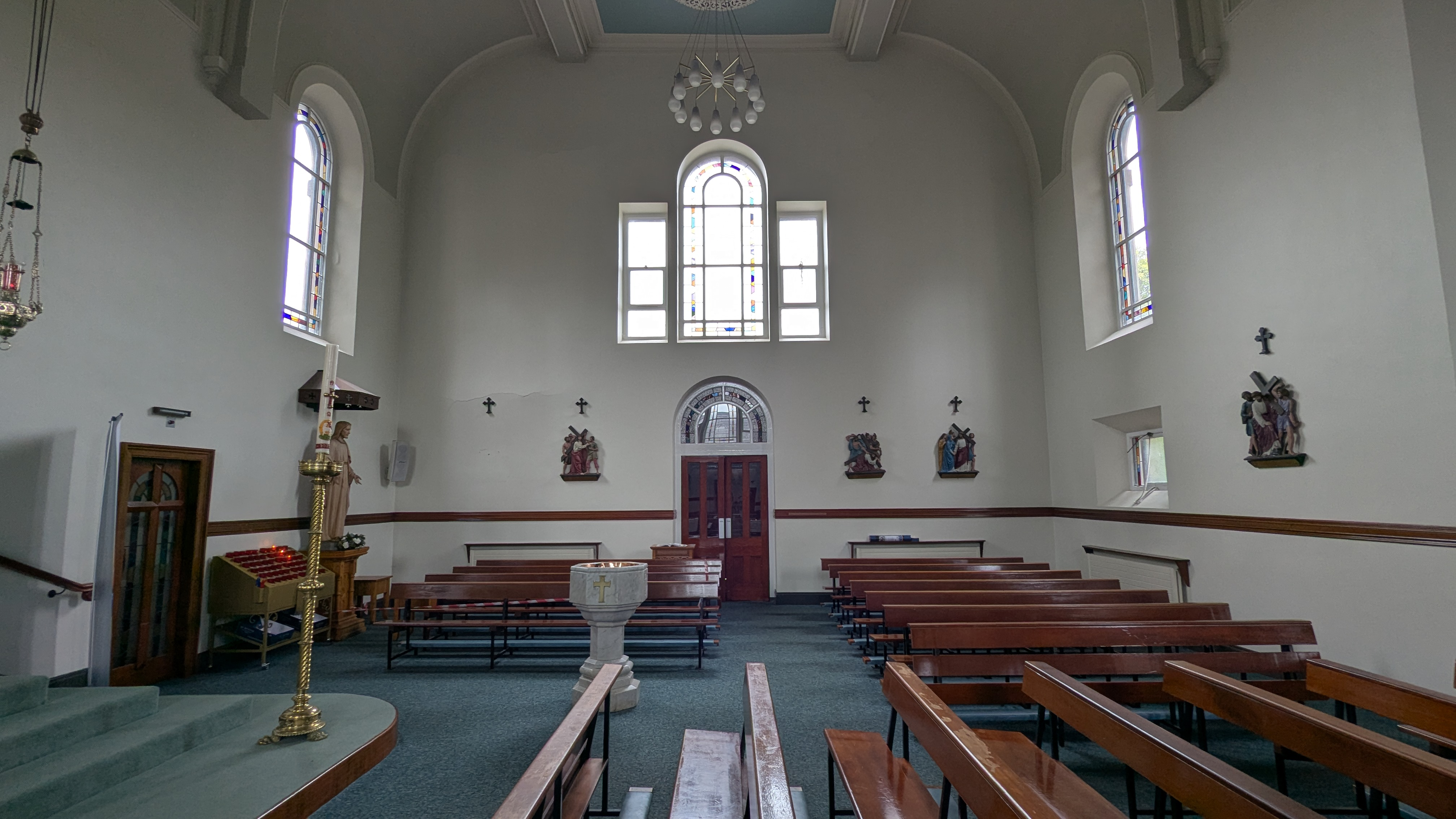
South transept

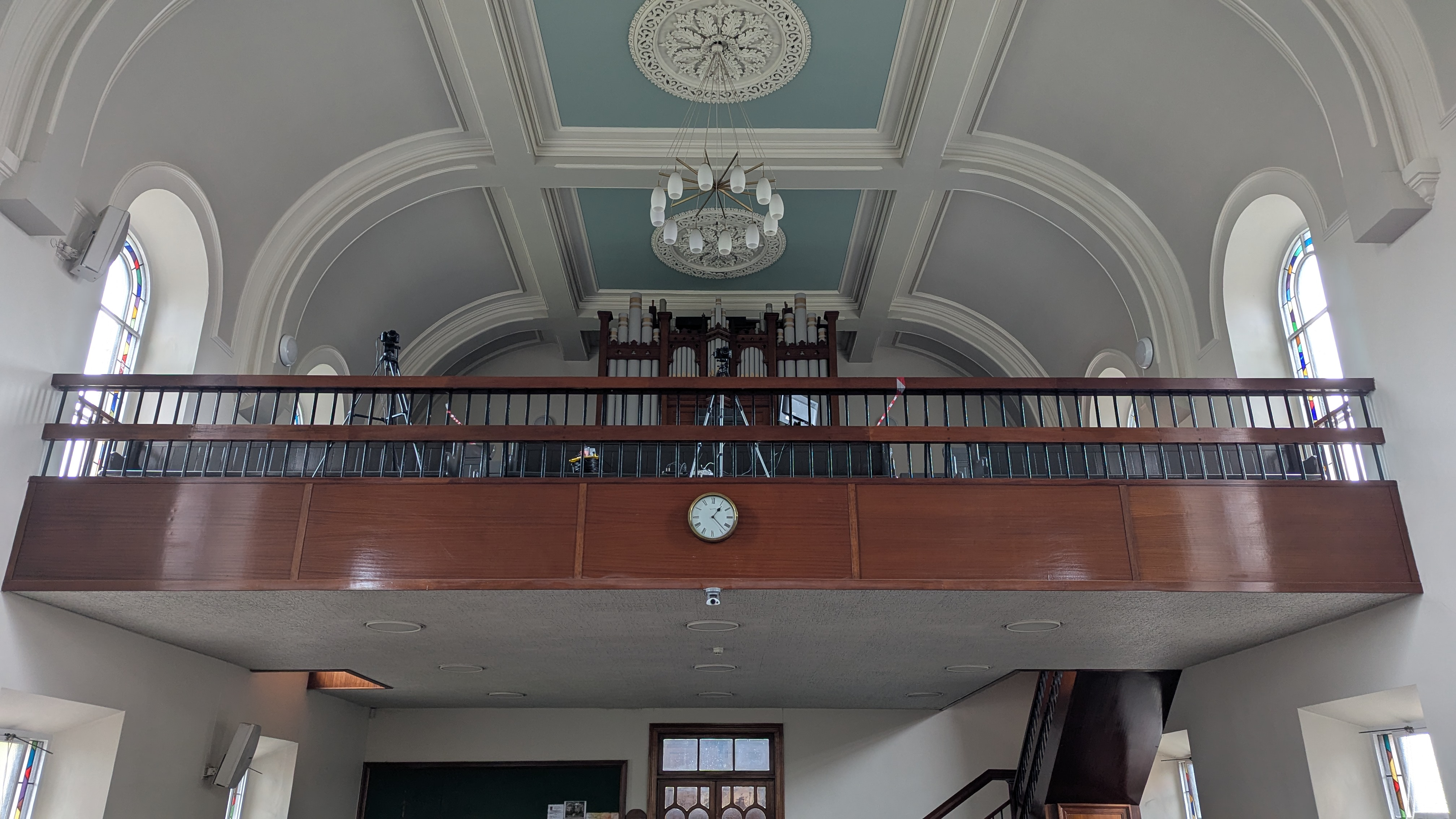
Organ loft
