= Belfast Cenotaph =

War memorial in Northern Ireland

Coordinates: 54°35′46″N 5°55′51″W

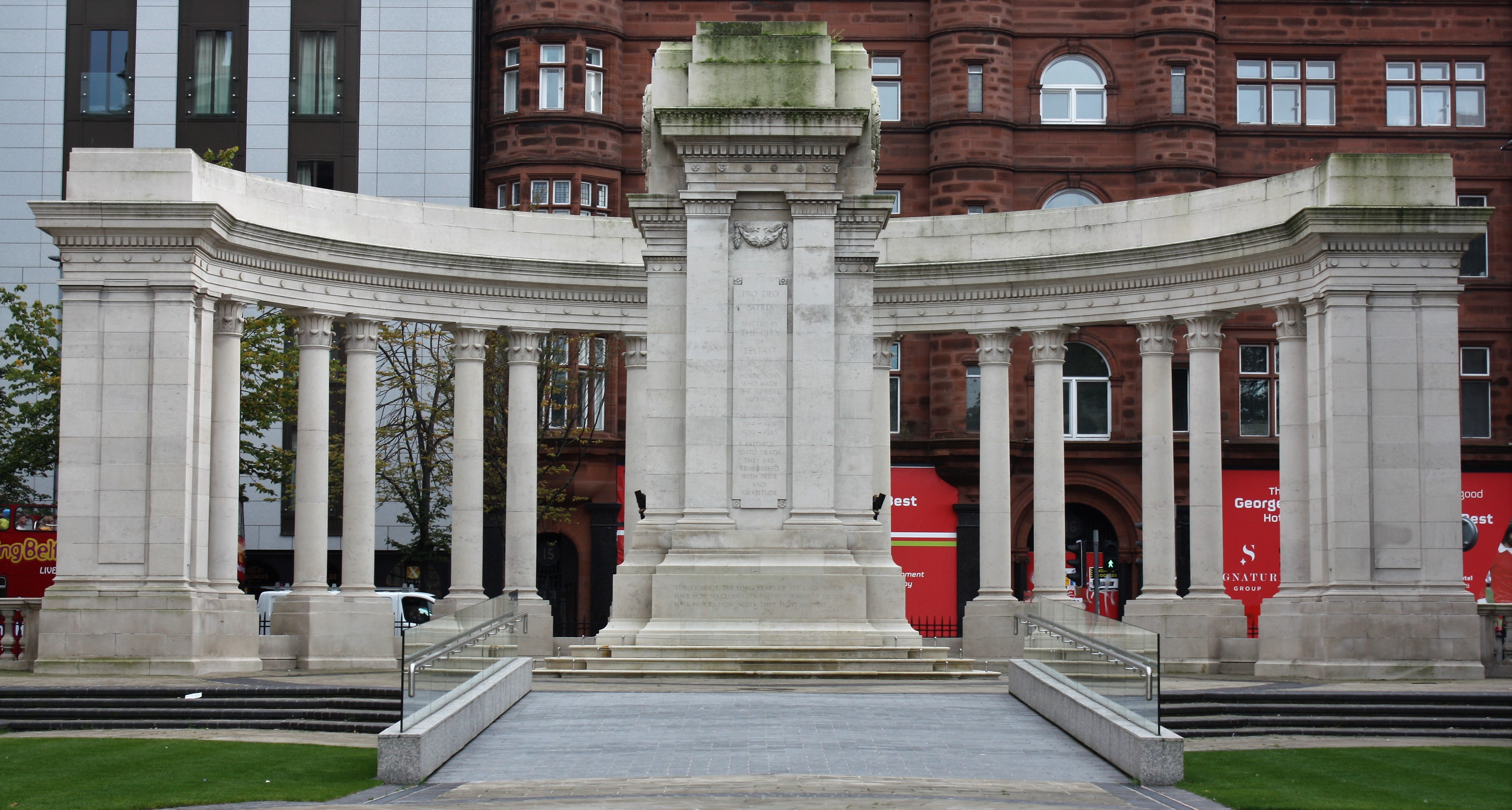
The Cenotaph in 2019

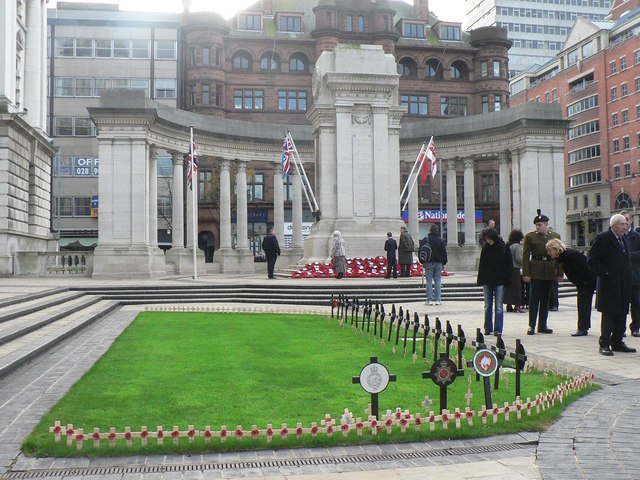

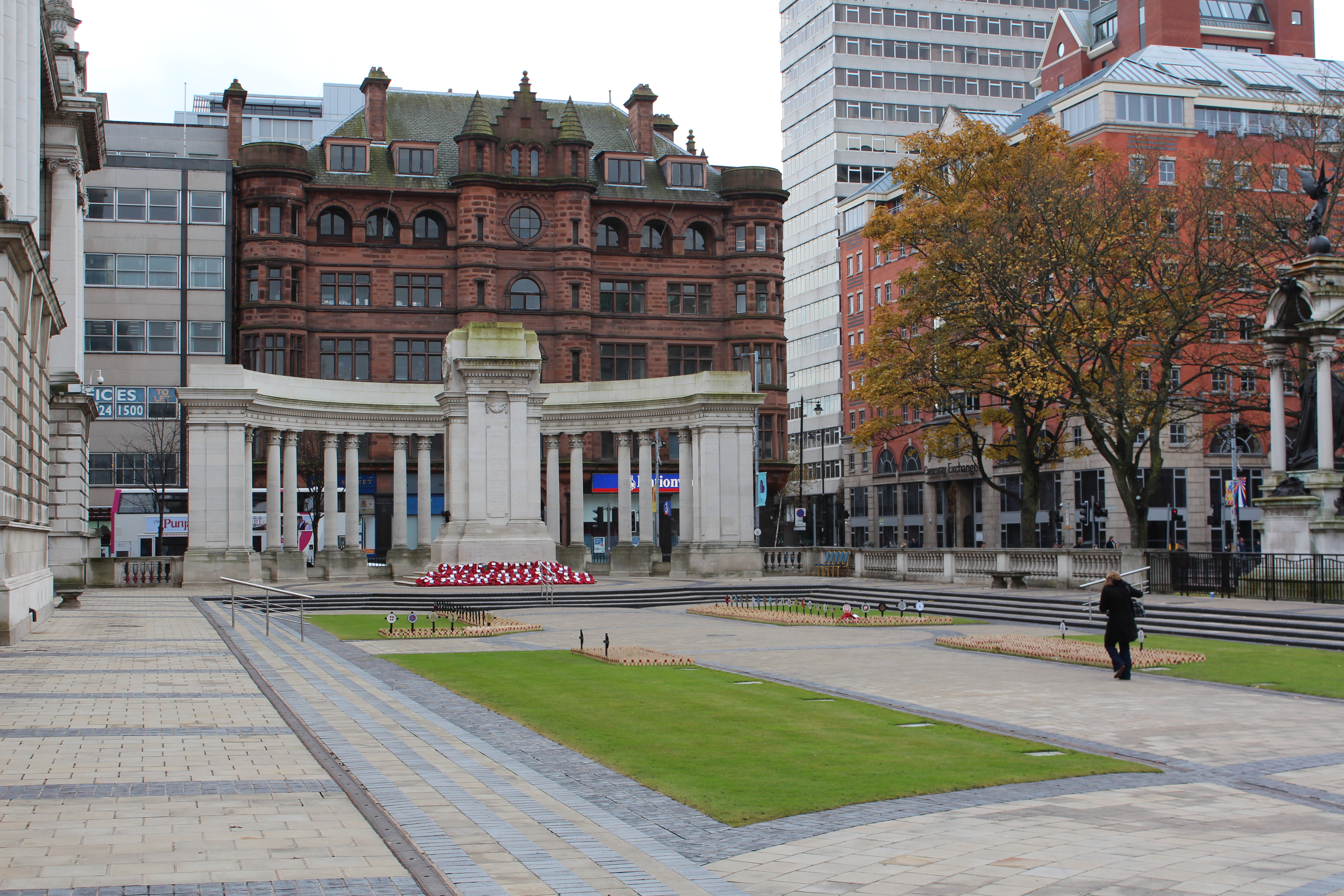

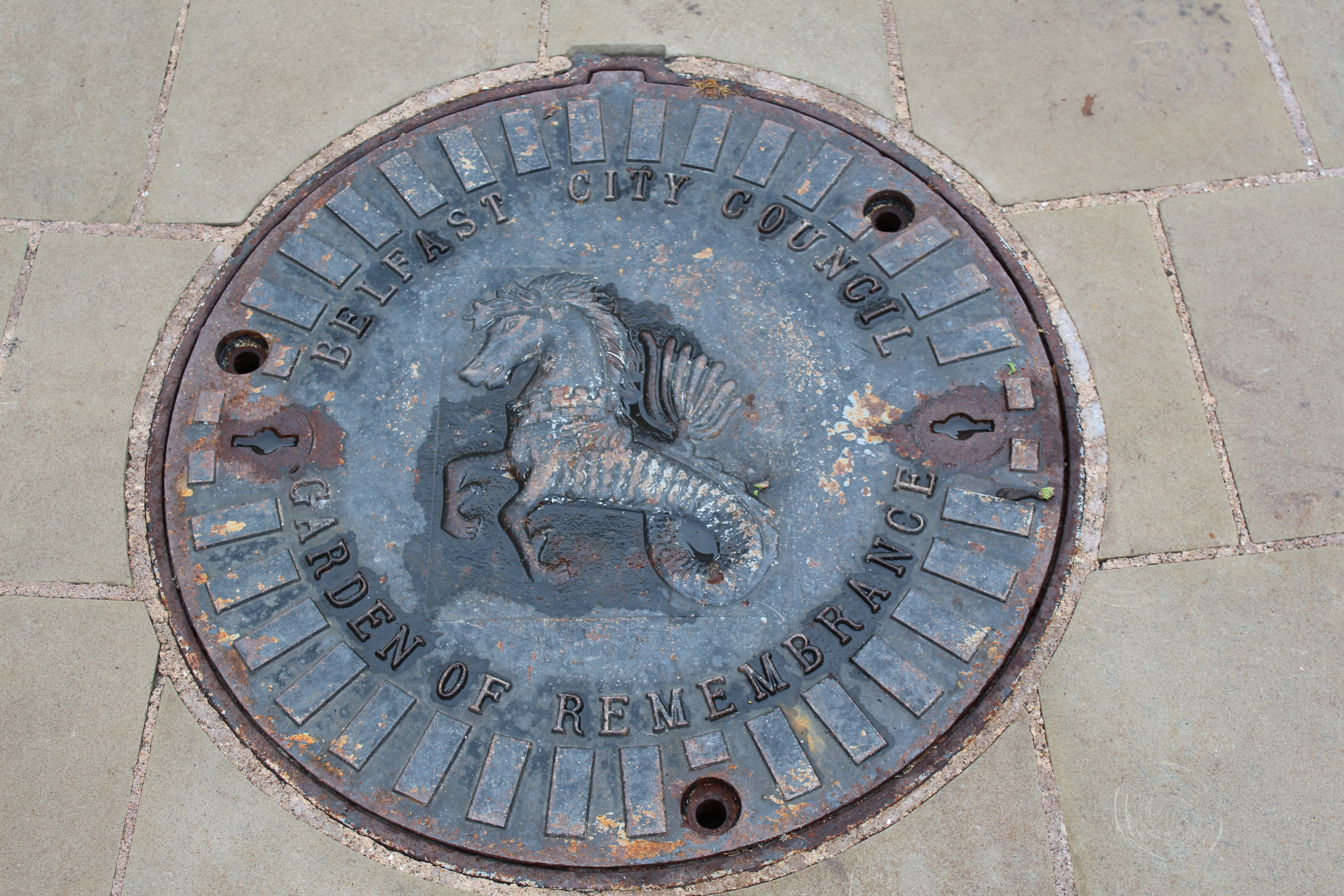

The Belfast Cenotaph is a war memorial in Belfast, Northern Ireland, in Donegall Square West, to the west of Belfast City Hall. Like the City Hall, it was designed by Sir Alfred Brumwell Thomas. The cenotaph was unveiled in 1929. It became a Grade A listed building in 1984.

The memorial includes a central Portland stone monument about 30 feet (9.1 m), with bronze brackets on either side supporting flagpoles. The top of the monument has carved laurel wreaths, symbolising victory and honour. It bears several inscriptions: on the north side: "PRO DEO / ET / PATRIA // ERECTED BY / THE CITY / OF / BELFAST / IN MEMORY OF / HER / HEROIC SONS / WHO MADE / THE SUPREME / SACRIFICE / IN / THE GREAT WAR / 1914–1918 // THROUGHOUT THE LONG YEARS OF STRUGGLE WHICH / HAVE NOW SO GLORIOUSLY ENDED THE MEN OF ULSTER / HAVE PROVED HOW NOBLY THEY FIGHT AND DIE / GEORGE R.I." and on the south face: "THEY DEDICATED THEIR LIVES TO A GREAT CAUSE AND THEIR ACHIEVEMENTS BY LAND, SEA AND AIR WON UNDYING FAME".

The monument stands on three steps. To the south is an arc of paired Corinthian columns forming a 25 feet (7.6 m)–high colonnade. To the north is a sunken garden of remembrance, which since 2011 has been the location for an annual Field of Remembrance. The paving of the garden was renewed in 1993.

The memorial was completed in 1927 and was officially unveiled by Viscount Allenby on 11 November 1929. No Catholic organisations participated in the formal unveiling ceremony, but veterans from the 16th (Irish) Division laid a wreath after the ceremony ended, and participated the following year.

In addition to the usual Remembrance Sunday services, there are also annual ceremonies to remember the first day of the Battle of the Somme on 1 July. Controversially, the first Sinn Féin Lord Mayor of Belfast Alex Maskey laid a wreath on 1 July 2002.

Nearby are memorials to the service of Irish regiments in the Boer War and the Korean War, and to US forces who arrived in Northern Ireland in 1942.

== See also ==
- List of public art in Belfast
- List of Grade A listed buildings in County Antrim
