= Malmaison Hotel, Belfast =

Hotel in Belfast, Northern Ireland

Malmaison Belfast Hotel
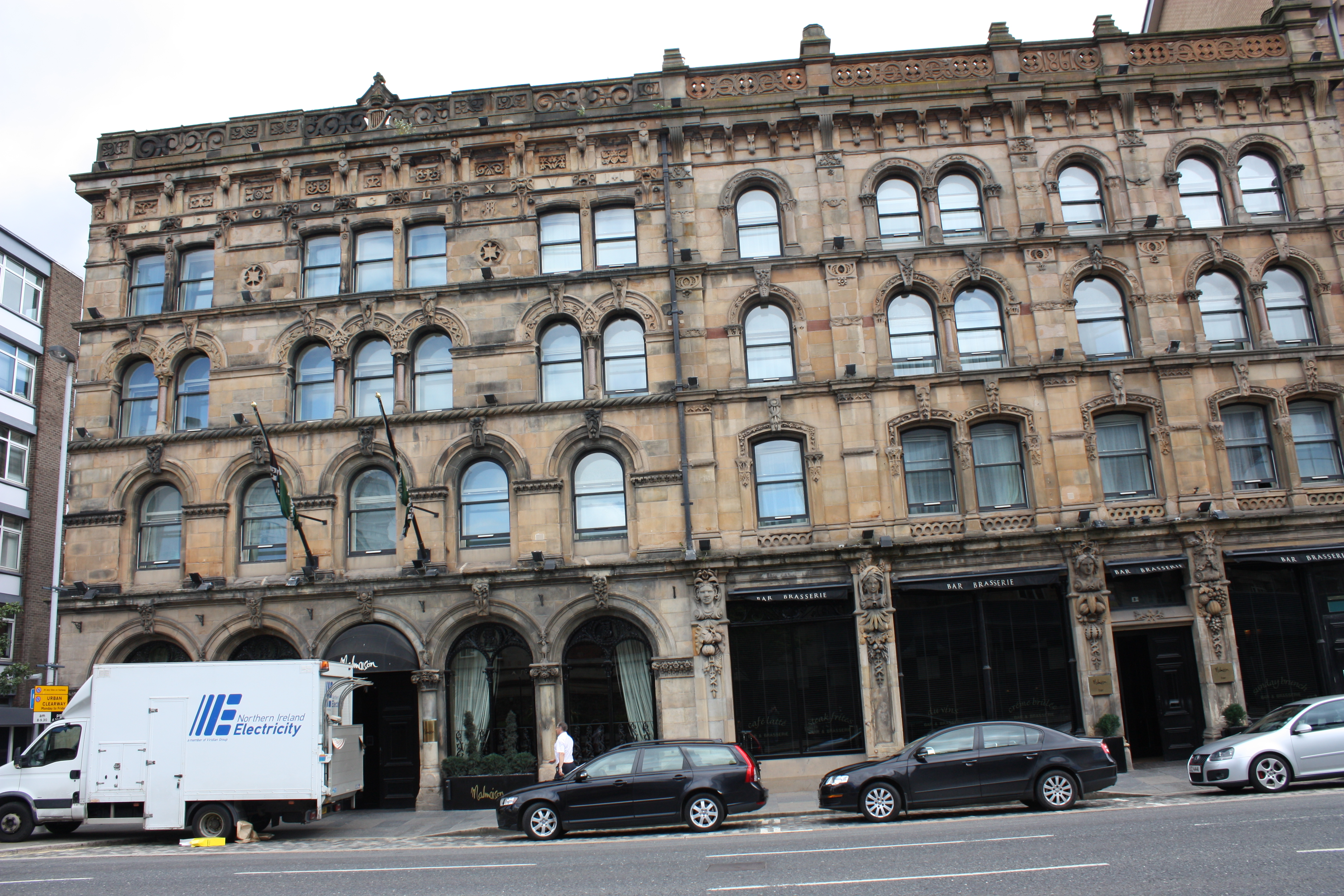
- Interactive map of the Malmaison Belfast Hotel area

General information
- Location: 34-38 Victoria Street, Belfast, County Antrim
- Coordinates: 54°36′0.3600″N 5°55′27.4800″W
- Owner: KSL

Malmaison Hotel Belfast is a hotel within a listed building in the city of Belfast in County Antrim, Northern Ireland. It is on the corner of Victoria Street and Marlborough Street and was formerly The McCausland Hotel.

== Features ==
It is built in what were two seed warehouses from the 1860s, retaining some original features including iron pillars and beams and carved stone gargoyles. It has 64 rooms, in bordello style, two rock’n’roll theme suites, and a bar and brasserie. It caters for meetings and conferences for up to 22 people. Before becoming the Malmaison it was The McCausland Hotel.

Marylebone Warwick Balfour (MWB) bought the Malmaison boutique hotel group in 2000. In 2004 it bought the McCausland Hotel in Belfast, and reopened it as the Irish Malmaison in December that year. It included two rock’n’roll suites designed by managing director Robert Cook.

== See also ==
- Malmaison (hotel chain)
