= Listed buildings in Northern Ireland =

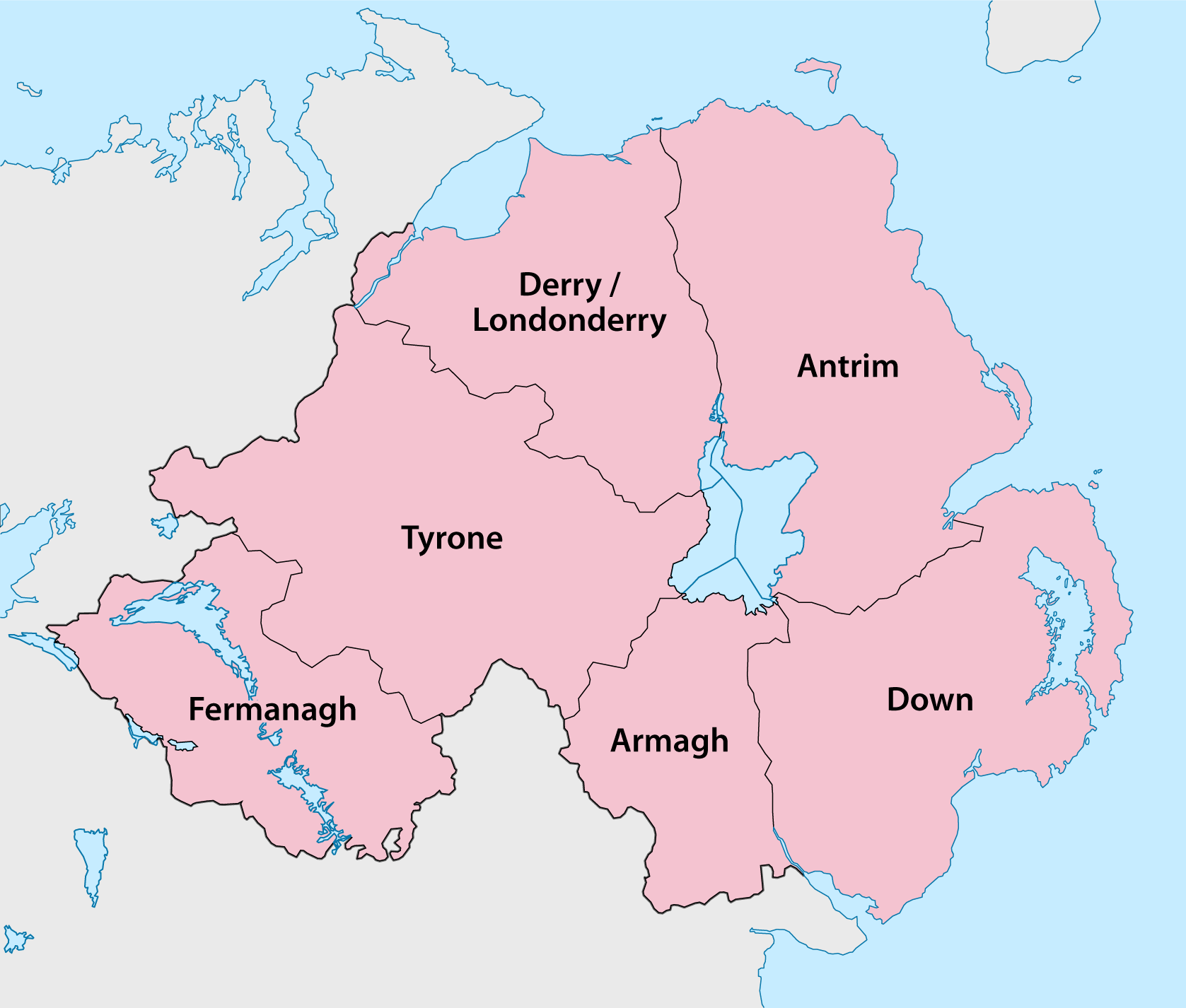
Northern Ireland's six counties

This is a list of listed buildings in Northern Ireland, which are among the listed buildings of the United Kingdom.

== Key ==
Grade	Criteria
A	Buildings of greatest importance to Northern Ireland including both outstanding architectural set-pieces and the least altered examples of each representative style, period and grouping.
B+	Buildings which might have merited grade A status but for detracting features such as an incomplete design, lower quality additions or alterations. Also included are buildings that because of exceptional features, interiors or environmental qualities are clearly above the general standard set by grade B buildings. A building may merit listing as grade B+ where its historic importance is greater than a similar building listed as grade B.
B1	Buildings of local importance and good examples of a particular period or style. A degree of alteration or imperfection of design may be acceptable.
B2	Buildings of local importance and good examples of a particular period or style. A degree of alteration or imperfection of design may be acceptable.

The organization of the lists in this series is on the same basis as the statutory register. The county names are those used in the register, which in the case of Northern Ireland means the province's six traditional counties.

== Grade A listed buildings in Northern Ireland ==
County	Number
List of Grade A listed buildings in County Antrim	80
List of Grade A listed buildings in County Armagh	32
List of Grade A listed buildings in County Down	43
List of Grade A listed buildings in County Fermanagh	9
List of Grade A listed buildings in County Londonderry	19
List of Grade A listed buildings in County Tyrone	23
TOTAL: Grade A listed buildings in Northern Ireland	206

== Grade B+ listed buildings in Northern Ireland ==
County	Number
List of Grade B+ listed buildings in County Antrim	157
List of Grade B+ listed buildings in County Armagh	48
List of Grade B+ listed buildings in County Down	164
List of Grade B+ listed buildings in County Fermanagh	34
List of Grade B+ listed buildings in County Londonderry	65
List of Grade B+ listed buildings in County Tyrone	110
TOTAL: Grade B+ listed buildings in Northern Ireland	578

== See also ==
- List of castles in Ireland
- List of monastic houses in Ireland
- List of country houses in the United Kingdom
- Listed buildings in Scotland
- Listed buildings in England
- Listed buildings in Wales
