= Archbishop's Palace, Armagh =

Municipal building in Armagh, Northern Ireland, England

Archbishop’s Palace, Armagh
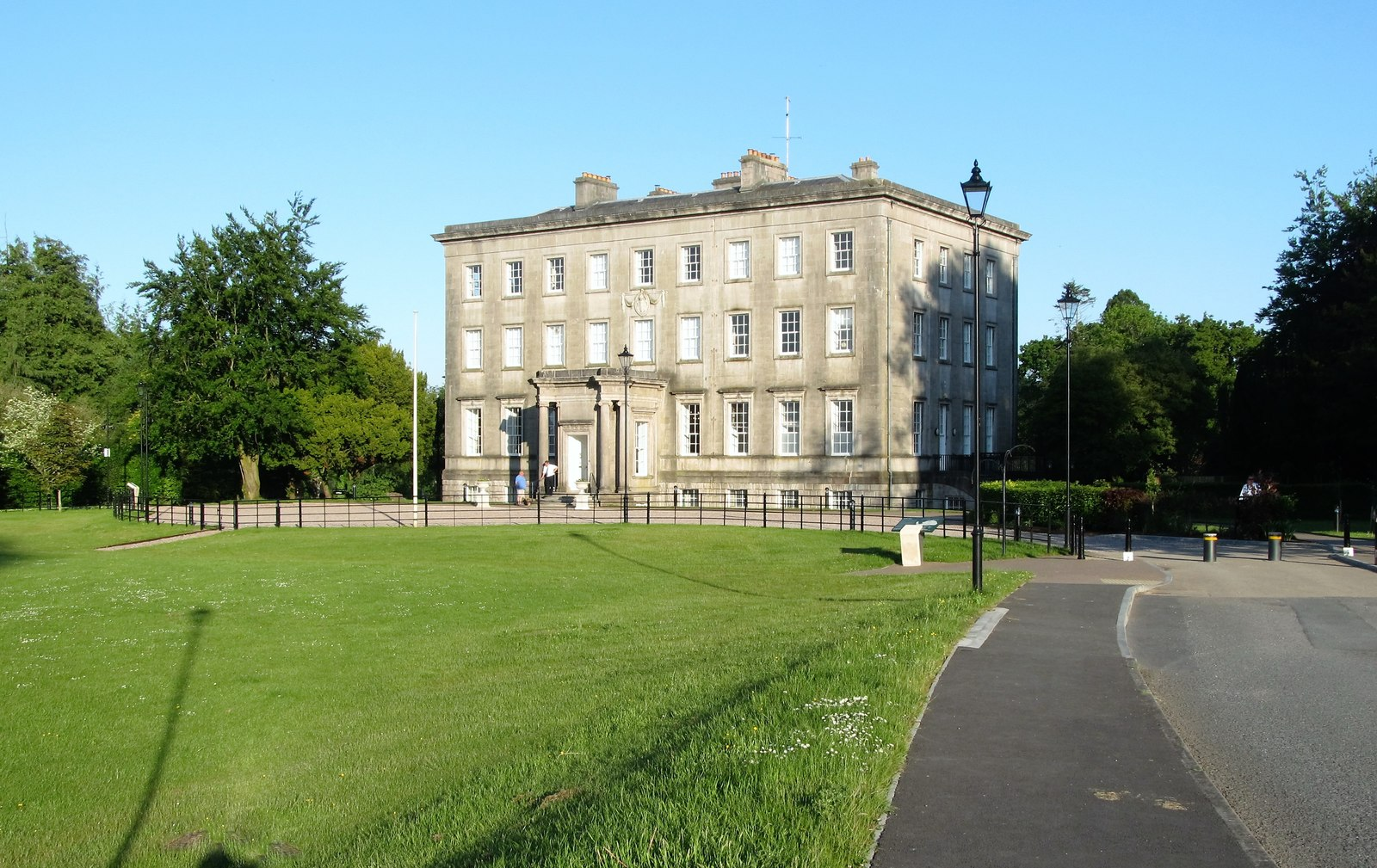
- North Facade

- Location within Northern Ireland
- 54°20′24″N 6°39′02″W
- Location: Palace demesne
- Nearest city: Armagh

History
- Built: 1770
- Built for: Richard Robinson
- Original use: Ecclesiastical Palace

Site notes
- Architect(s): Thomas Cooley, Francis Johnston
- Architectural style: Neoclassical
- Current use: Government Building
- Owner: Armagh, Banbridge and Craigavon District Council

Listed Building – Grade A
- Designated: 25 June 1975
- Reference no.: HB15/18/016

The Archbishop's Palace, Armagh, Northern Ireland, is a landmark Neo-Classical building located on 300 acres of parkland just south of the centre of the city. The building served as primary residence of the Church of Ireland Archbishops of Armagh for over two hundred years, from 1770 to 1975, and thereafter as headquarters of Armagh City and District Council from then until April 2015 when that local authority was replaced following the reform of local government in Northern Ireland in that year.

The Palace was built when then Archbishop Richard Robinson sought to relocate the principal residence of the archbishops from Drogheda to the titular city of his office. Thomas Cooley undertook the design of the initial building and Francis Johnston was responsible for designing an additional floor at a later stage. The palace currently sits at the centre of the Palace Demesne Public Park, and serves as the office of the Lord Mayor of the new Armagh, Banbridge, and Craigavon Borough.

The building became protected as a Grade A listed building (HB 15/18/016) in 1975.

== History ==
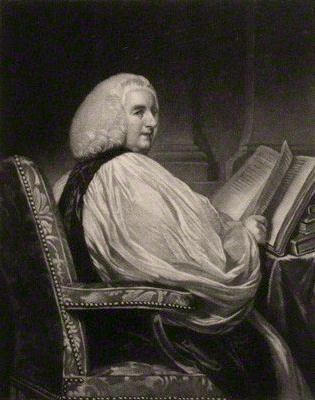
Archbishop Robinson, who commissioned the Palace

Richard Robinson was elected Archbishop of Armagh in 1765, which brought with it the Primacy of the Church of Ireland, and was at once dissatisfied with the modest residence provided on English Street, as well as the lack of improvement in the ancient Irish ecclesiastical capital generally. The Archbishop's Palace was constructed as part of Robinson's project to revitalise the old city generally upon his succeeding to the See of Armagh. Thomas Cooley undertook the design of the initial two-storey building, which was 7 bays wide by 4 bays deep, and Francis Johnston was responsible for designing an additional floor in the 1820s for Archbishop John George de la Poer Beresford.

The house and its walled demesne were referred to by Inglis in 1834 as

in excellent order … laid out with much taste...

Following the disestablishment of the Church of Ireland in 1871, Archbishop Knox sought to ensure that the palace and its grounds could continue to be used in perpetuity, as they were no longer being able to rely on tithe income for such purposes. The palace ceased to be the residence of the archbishop, during the tenure of Archbishop Simms, in the 1970s.

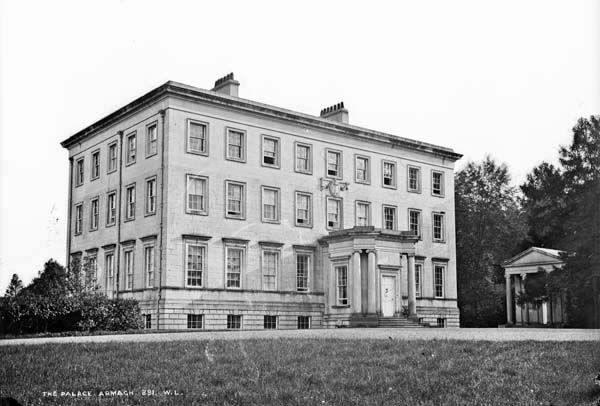
Photograph of the palace, early 20th century

From 1975 to 2015, the building served as the headquarters for Armagh City and District Council until April 2015 when that local authority was replaced following the reform of local government in Northern Ireland in that year. Since April 2015 the palace has served as the office of the Lord Mayor of the new Armagh, Banbridge, and Craigavon Borough.

== Grounds ==
=== Features ===
The palace is surrounded by grassland to the North, and mixed woodland (largely mature sycamore trees) to the south. There are some 19th century exotic trees near the Palace while a golf course and belt of protective woodland make up the north eastern and north sections of the park. Notable man-made features of the estate include the following:

- A walled garden is at the north end, with a garden house (HB 15/18/014), not cultivated at present;
- A 19th century glasshouse (HB 15/18/020) and ice house to the west of the Palace (HB 15/18/015);
- The stables and coach yard (HB 15/18/018), which now serve as a visitor's centre;
- Ruins of a Franciscan Friary, (SMR ARM 12:16) and a Holy Well dedicated to Saint Brigid (SMR ARM 12:17).

=== Rokeby Obelisk ===
Atop the high-point of the Palace grounds, Knox's hill, stands the Rokeby Obelisk erected in 1782–83, at the southern end of the park. This feature was constructed at the instigation of Archbishop Robinson at a time of severe distress in Armagh City, with employment afforded to those who could not find it elsewhere. The Obelisk's name comes from Rokeby Hall, country seat of Robinson's father, Sir Thomas Robinson, in the North Riding of Yorkshire and subject of Sir Walter Scott's epic poem Rokeby.

It is dedicated by Robinson to Hugh Percy, 1st Duke of Northumberland, and Lord Lieutenant of Ireland 1763–1765 as Northumberland had been instrumental in securing the Archbishopric of Armagh for Robinson, who prior to that had been Bishop of Kildare. Both the Northumberland family's and the Royal coat of arms adorn the pedestal, whilst armorial bearings associated with Robinson are detailed on the shaft, as well as his motto, Non Nobis solum sed toti mundo nati.

Standing 113 feet tall, the Rokeby Obelisk has been awarded “Grade B” listed status with designation HB15/18/021.

=== Primatial Chapel ===
Also on the grounds, immediately adjacent to the Palace, is the Primatial Chapel, also built for Robinson. The Primatial Chapel is a Grade A listed building in its own right with designation HB15/18/017.

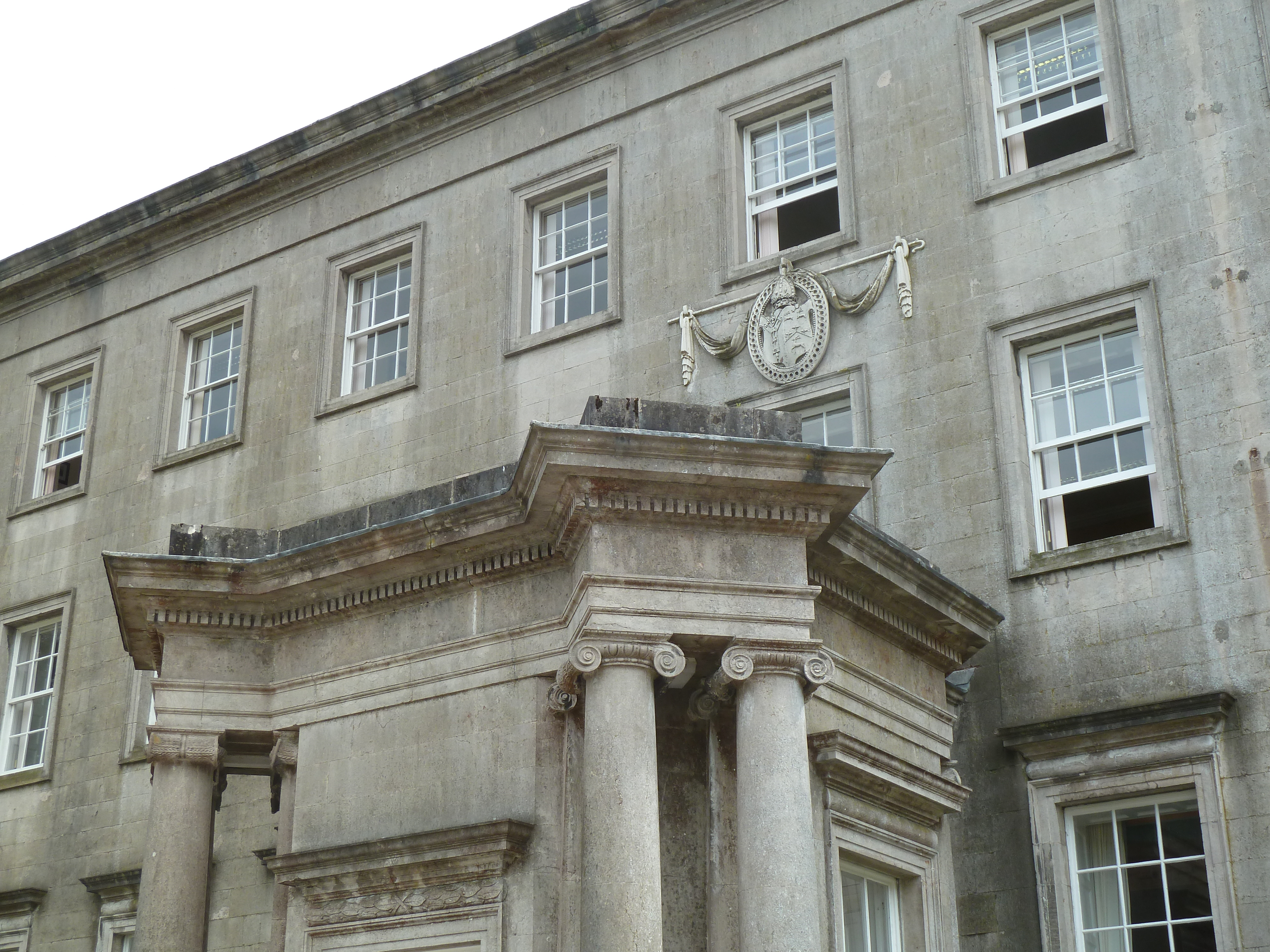
Front porch of the Palace, added in the early 1800s

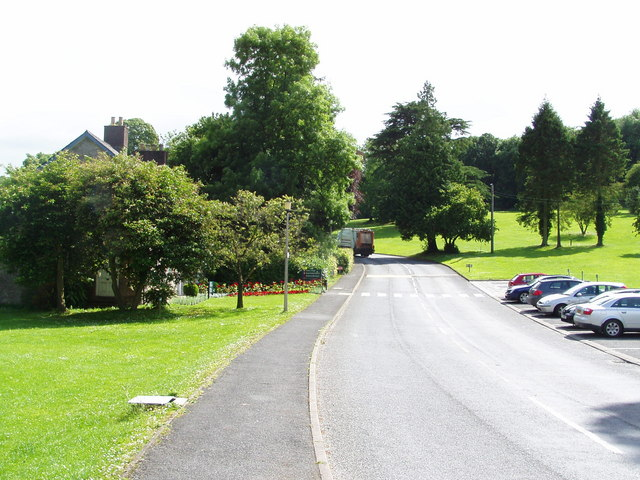
Road near the entrance to the Palace's Grounds

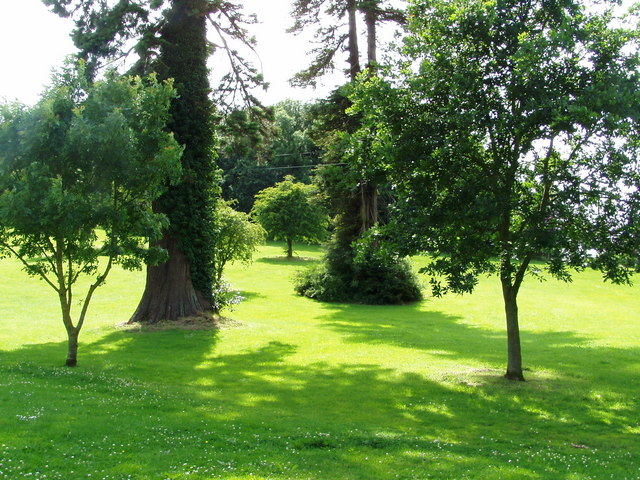
Woodland on the Palace grounds

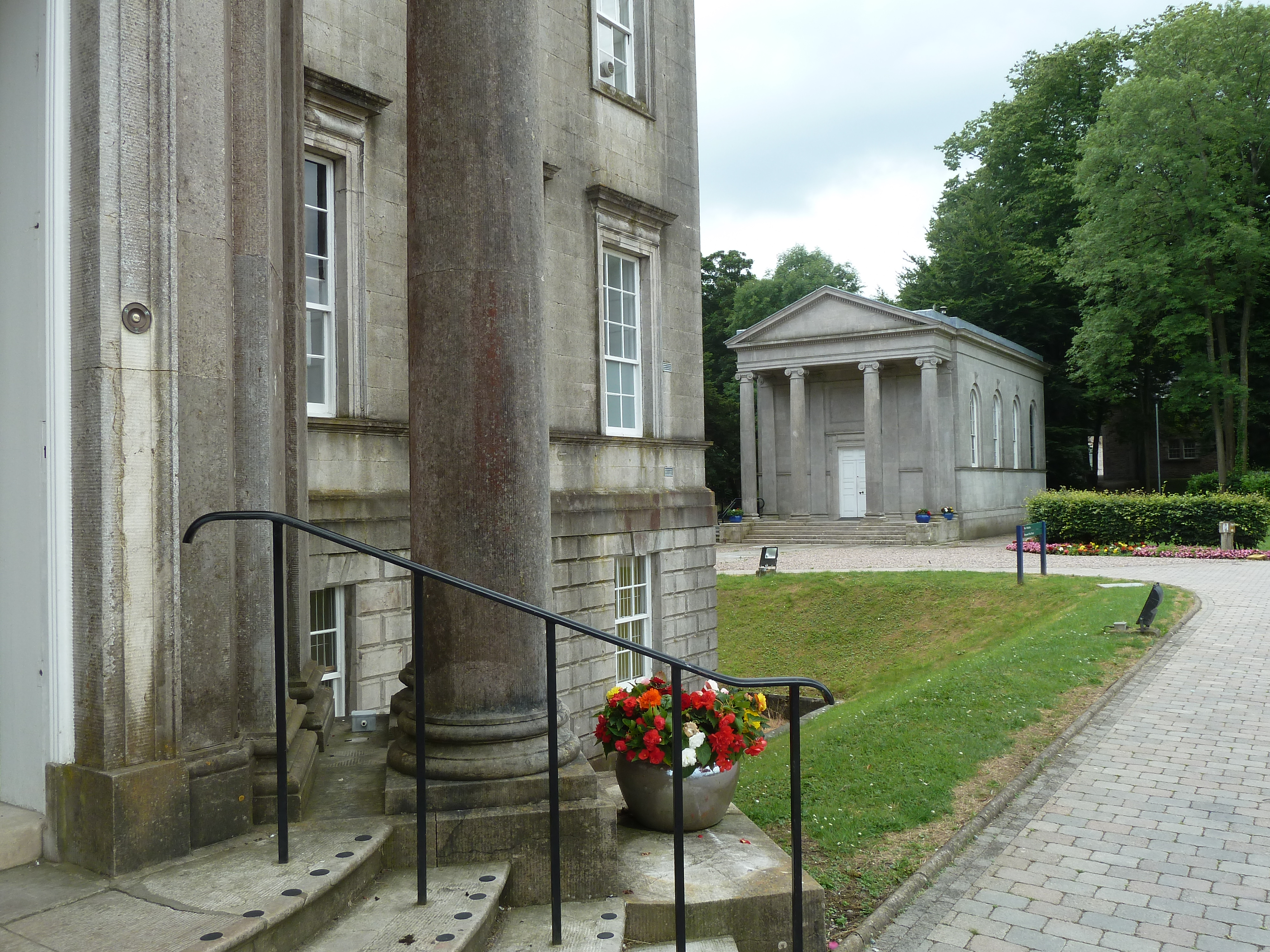
Primatial Chapel, adjacent to the Palace

== See also ==
- County Armagh
- History of Northern Ireland
- List of Category A Listed Buildings in County Armagh
- List of Category B+ Listed Buildings in County Armagh
