= List of Grade A listed buildings in County Armagh =

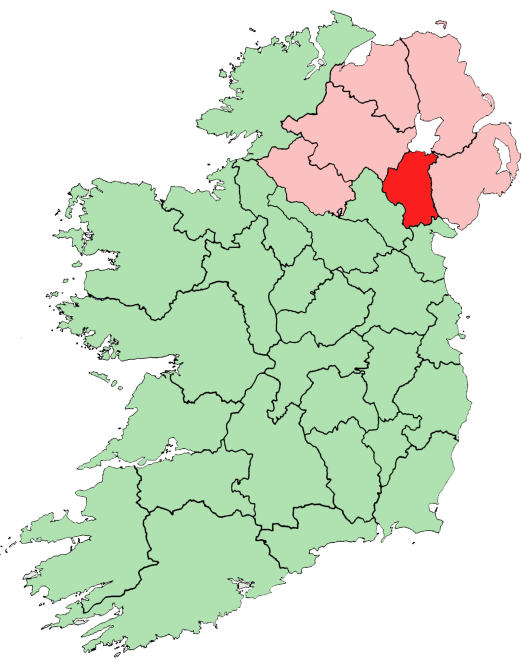
County Armagh within Ireland

This is a list of Grade A listed buildings in County Armagh, Northern Ireland.

In Northern Ireland, the term listed building refers to a building or other structure officially designated as being of "special architectural or historic interest". Grade A structures are those considered to be "buildings of greatest importance to Northern Ireland including both outstanding architectural set-pieces and the least altered examples of each representative style, period and type." Once listed, severe restrictions are imposed on the modifications allowed to a building's structure or its fittings. Listed building consent must be obtained from local authorities prior to any alteration to such a structure.

Listing began later in Northern Ireland than in the rest of the UK: the first provision for listing was contained in the Planning (Northern Ireland) Order 1972; and the current legislative basis for listing is the Planning (Northern Ireland) Order 1991. Under Article 42 of the Order, the relevant Department of the Northern Ireland Executive is required to compile lists of buildings of "special architectural or historic interest". Since 2016, the responsibility for the listing process rests with the Historic Environment Division of the Department for Communities (DfC).

Following the introduction of listing, an initial survey of Northern Ireland's building stock was begun in 1974. By the time of the completion of this First Survey in 1994, the listing process had developed considerably, and it was therefore decided to embark upon a Second Survey, which is still ongoing, to update and cross-check the original information. Information gathered during this survey, relating to both listed and unlisted buildings, is entered into the publicly accessible Northern Ireland Buildings Database. A range of listing criteria, which aim to define architectural and historic interest, are used to determine whether or not to list a building.

County Armagh covers 1,254 square kilometres (484 sq mi), and has a population of around 160,000. The County has 30 Grade A listed buildings, of which 25 are within the city of Armagh.

== Listed buildings ==
Building address	Grid Ref. (Note: Sometimes known as OSGB36, the grid reference is based on the British national grid reference system used by the Ordnance Survey.) Geo-coordinates	Type (Note: The type of structure, as identified by the DfC.)	Local authority	Second Survey	Original Survey	HB Number (Note: The "HB Number" is a unique number assigned to each listed building by the DfC.)	Image	Ref.
Gosford Castle, Gosford Demesne, Markethill	54°18′38″N 6°31′09″W	Country House	Armagh	–	A	HB15/07/001	Upload another image See more images	
Richhill Castle (Richhill House), Richhill	54°22′21″N 6°32′56″W	House	Armagh	–	A	HB15/13/001	Upload Photo	
Court House, The Mall, Armagh	54°21′03″N 6°39′10″W	Court House	Armagh	–	A	HB15/16/001	Upload another image See more images	
Armagh Observatory, College Hill, Armagh	54°21′11″N 6°39′00″W	Observatory	Armagh	–	A	HB15/16/003	Upload another image See more images	
1-5 Charlemont Place, The Mall East, Armagh	54°20′59″N 6°39′01″W	House	Armagh	–	A	HB15/17/010 A-E	Upload another image See more images	
Portico front of Armagh County Museum, The Mall East, Armagh	54°20′58″N 6°38′58″W	Gallery/ Museum	Armagh	–	A	HB15/17/011	Upload another image	
Former Bank of Ireland (now Patrick's Fold), 36 Scotch Street, Armagh	54°20′48″N 6°39′07″W	Bank	Armagh	–	A	HB15/18/003	Upload another image	
The Bishop's Palace, Armagh	54°20′25″N 6°39′04″W	House	Armagh	–	A	HB15/18/016	Upload another image See more images	
Primate's Chapel, Armagh	54°20′24″N 6°39′06″W	Church	Armagh	–	A	HB15/18/017	Upload another image	
Cathedral Church of St. Patrick (Church of Ireland), Armagh	54°20′52″N 6°39′22″W	Church	Armagh	–	A	HB15/20/001	Upload another image See more images	
1-11 Vicar's Hill, Armagh	54°20′53″N 6°39′25″W	House - Terrace	Armagh	–	A	HB15/20/005 A-K	Upload another image	
Public Library, Abbey Street, Armagh	54°20′55″N 6°39′26″W	Library	Armagh	–	A	HB15/20/008	Upload another image See more images	
St. Patrick's R C Cathedral, Cathedral Road, Armagh	54°21′10″N 6°39′32″W	Church	Armagh	–	A	HB15/20/020	Upload another image See more images	
Brownlow House, Windsor Avenue, Lurgan	54°27′55″N 6°19′40″W	House	Craigavon	–	A	HB14/24/018	Upload another image See more images	
Killevy Castle, Ballintemple Road, Meigh	54°07′23″N 6°24′40″W	Country House	Newry and Mourne	A	A	HB16/13/001A	Upload another image	
Craigmore Viaduct, Bessbrook	54°11′36″N 6°22′03″W	Viaduct	Newry and Mourne	A	A	HB16/24/004	Upload another image See more images	
