= Armagh County Council =

Local authority of County Armagh, Northern Ireland, 1899–1973

History
- Founded: 1 April 1899
- Disbanded: 1 October 1973
- Succeeded by: Armagh City and District Council; Craigavon Borough Council; Dungannon and South Tyrone Borough Council; Newry and Mourne District Council

Meeting place
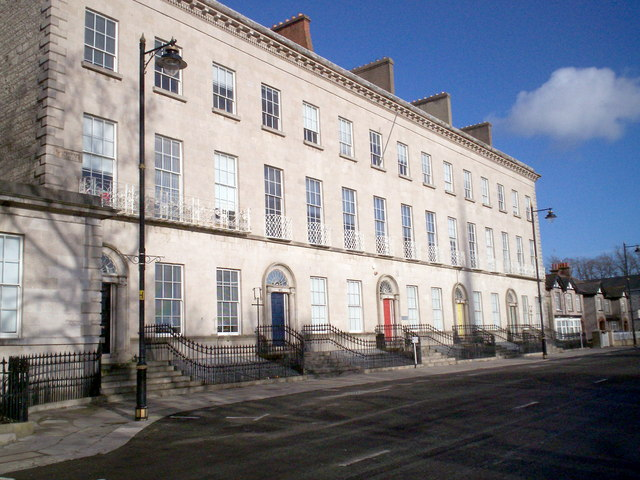
- Charlemont Place, Armagh

Armagh County Council was the authority responsible for local government in County Armagh, Northern Ireland.

== History ==
Armagh County Council was formed by orders issued under the Local Government (Ireland) Act 1898 which came into effect on 1 April 1899. It was the authority of for the administrative county of County Armagh, which included the former judicial county of Armagh, except for the part in the town of Newry, which became part of the administrative county of Down.

The Local Government (Ireland) Act 1919 introduced proportional representation by means of the single transferable vote (PR-STV) for the 1920 Armagh County Council election. PR-STV was abolished in Northern Ireland under the Local Government Act 1922, with a reversion to first-past-the-post for the 1924 Northern Ireland local elections, the first local elections held in the new jurisdiction.

It was originally based at the Armagh Courthouse but moved to Charlemont Place in 1945. It was abolished on 1 October 1973 under the Local Government Act (Northern Ireland) 1972.
