= List of Grade A listed buildings in County Londonderry =

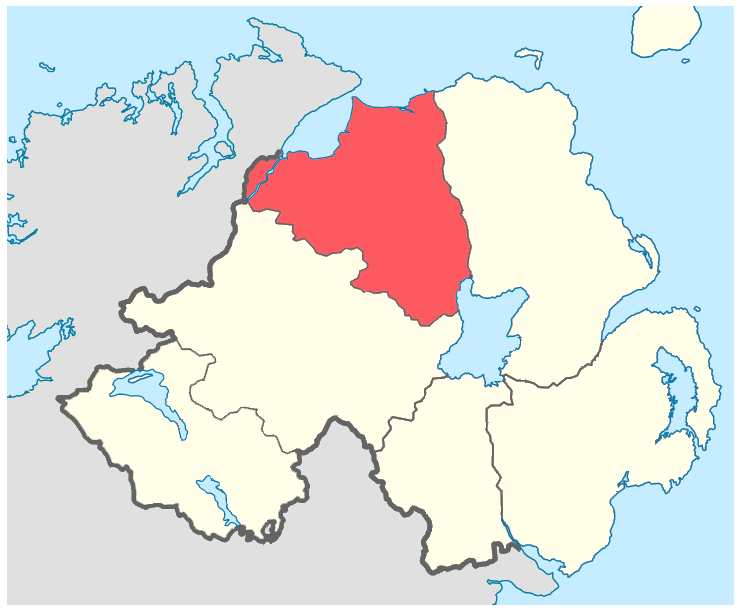
County Londonderry within Ireland

This is a list of Grade A listed buildings in County Londonderry, Northern Ireland.

In Northern Ireland, the term listed building refers to a building or other structure officially designated as being of "special architectural or historic interest". Grade A structures are those considered to be "buildings of greatest importance to Northern Ireland including both outstanding architectural set-pieces and the least altered examples of each representative style, period and type." Once listed, severe restrictions are imposed on the modifications allowed to a building's structure or its fittings. Listed building consent must be obtained from local authorities prior to any alteration to such a structure.

Listing began later in Northern Ireland than in the rest of the UK: the first provision for listing was contained in the Planning (Northern Ireland) Order 1972; and the current legislative basis for listing is the Planning (Northern Ireland) Order 1991. Under Article 42 of the Order, the relevant Department of the Northern Ireland Executive is required to compile lists of buildings of "special architectural or historic interest". Since 2016, the responsibility for the listing process rests with the Historic Environment Division of the Department for Communities (DfC).

Following the introduction of listing, an initial survey of Northern Ireland's building stock was begun in 1974. By the time of the completion of this First Survey in 1994, the listing process had developed considerably, and it was therefore decided to embark upon a Second Survey, which is still ongoing, to update and cross-check the original information. Information gathered during this survey, relating to both listed and unlisted buildings, is entered into the publicly accessible Northern Ireland Buildings Database. A range of listing criteria, which aim to define architectural and historic interest, are used to determine whether or not to list a building.

County Londonderry covers 2,074 square kilometres (801 sq mi), and has a population of around 233,500. The County has 20 Grade A listed buildings.

== Listed buildings ==
Building address	Grid Ref. (Note: Sometimes known as OSGB36, the grid reference is based on the British national grid reference system used by the Ordnance Survey.) Geo-coordinates	Type (Note: The type of structure, as identified by the DfC.)	Local authority	Second Survey	Original Survey	HB Number (Note: The "HB Number" is a unique number assigned to each listed building by the DfC.)	Image	Ref.
Mussenden Temple, Downhill, Castlerock	55°10′04″N 6°48′39″W	Memorial	Coleraine	–	A	HB03/12/016	Upload another image See more images	
Cromore House, North Ballyleese, Coleraine	55°10′33″N 6°41′47″W	Country House	Coleraine	–	A	HB03/07/011	Upload Photo	
Liffock House (a.k.a. Hezlett House), Liffock, Coleraine	55°09′18″N 6°47′24″W	Gallery/ Museum	Coleraine	A	B+	HB03/12/028	Upload another image See more images	
Springhill House, 20 Springhill Road, Moneymore, Magherafelt	54°41′07″N 6°39′21″W	Country House	Cookstown	A	A	HB09/06/024 B	Upload another image See more images	
The Barn at Springhill, Moneymore, Magherafelt	54°41′10″N 6°39′18″W	Farm Buildings	Cookstown	A	A	HB09/06/024 C	Upload Photo	
St Matthias Church of Ireland Church, Loup Road, Moneymore, Magherafelt	54°41′45″N 6°37′03″W	Church	Cookstown	A	A	HB09/09/001	Upload another image	
118 Ballyartan Road, Claudy	54°54′42″N 7°11′47″W	House	Londonderry	A	B1	HB01/02/013	Upload Photo	
Banagher Presbyterian Church, Glenshane Road, Claudy	55°12′41″N 7°35′28″W	Church	Londonderry	A	A	HB01/01/003	Upload another image	
Prehen House, Prehen	54°58′32″N 7°20′47″W	House	Derry	A	B1	HB01/04/001 A	Upload another image See more images	
Magee University College, Northland Road, Derry	55°00′24″N 7°19′25″W	University/ College Building	Derry	–	A	HB01/22/009 A	Upload another image See more images	
St Columb's Cathedral, St. Columb's Court, Derry	54°59′38″N 7°19′24″W	Church	Derry	–	A	HB01/19/001	Upload another image See more images	
The Deanery, 30 Bishop Street, Derry	54°59′41″N 7°19′23″W	Rectories/ Manses Etc.	Derry	–	A	HB01/19/004	Upload Photo	
Guildhall, Shipquay Place, Derry	54°59′51″N 7°19′11″W	Town Hall	Derry	–	A	HB01/19/038	Upload another image See more images	
Bellarena House, Seacoast Road, Limavady	55°06′41″N 6°57′39″W	Country House	Limavady	A	A	HB02/09/002 A	Upload Photo	
Martello Tower, Point Road, Magilligan Limavady	55°11′32″N 6°57′49″W	Fort	Limavady	A	B	HB02/09/016	Upload another image See more images	
Drenagh House, 15 Dowland Road, Fruithill, Limavady	55°03′16″N 6°55′26″W	Country House	Limavady	A	A	HB02/11/002 A	Upload Photo	
Ballykelly Presbyterian Church, Main Street, Ballykelly	55°02′37″N 7°00′52″W	Church	Limavady	A	A	HB02/10/006	Upload another image	
Dredge Bridge, Moyola Park, Castlepark, Magherafelt	54°46′45″N 6°33′24″W	Bridge	Magherafelt	–	A	HB08/10/032	Upload Photo	
Court House, Union Road, Magherafelt	54°45′32″N 6°36′38″W	Court House	Magherafelt	–	A	HB08/15/009	Upload Photo	
