= Charlemont Place, Armagh =

County building in Armagh, Northern Ireland

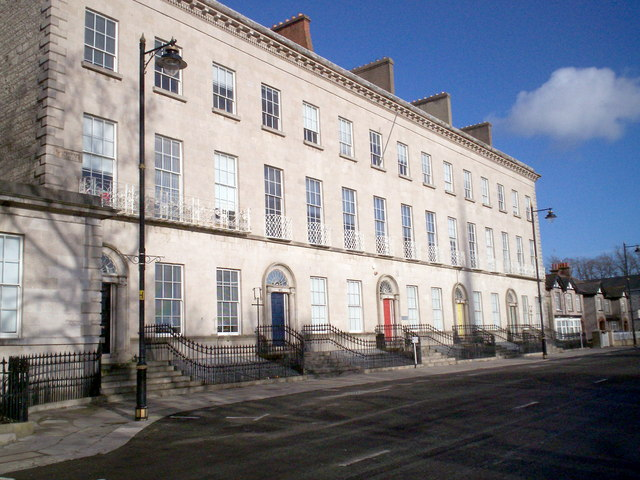
- Charlemont Place, Armagh

- Shown in Northern Ireland
- 54.3497°N 6.6500°W
- Location: Armagh, County Armagh

History
- Built: c.1830

Site notes
- Architect: William Murray
- Architectural style: Georgian style

Listed Building – Grade A
- Official name: 1 Charlemont Place
- Designated: 30 April 1975
- Reference no.: HB 15/17/010A

Listed Building – Grade A
- Official name: 2 Charlemont Place
- Designated: 30 April 1975
- Reference no.: HB 15/17/010B

Listed Building – Grade A
- Official name: 3 Charlemont Place
- Designated: 30 April 1975
- Reference no.: HB 15/17/010C

Listed Building – Grade A
- Official name: 4 Charlemont Place
- Designated: 30 April 1975
- Reference no.: HB 15/17/010D

Listed Building – Grade A
- Official name: 5 Charlemont Place
- Designated: 30 April 1975
- Reference no.: HB 15/17/010E

Charlemont Place is a row of terraced houses in Armagh, County Armagh, Northern Ireland. The buildings served as the headquarters of Armagh County Council from 1945 to 1973. They are all Grade A listed buildings.

== History ==
The buildings, which were designed by William Murray (1789–1849) in the Georgian style, were built between 1827 and 1830. The design for each of the buildings involved a main frontage of three bays facing onto Charlemont Place; they were faced in ashlar limestone and each building featured a round headed doorway in the left bay flanked by pilasters supporting an entablature with a fanlight above; there were sash windows with cast iron balconies on the first floor. The cornice was decorated with dentils and modillions. Archiseek has described the row of houses as "one of the best Georgian terraces in Ireland outside of Dublin".

The street was named after the Lord Lieutenant of Tyrone, Francis Caulfeild, 2nd Earl of Charlemont. The buildings were initially occupied by senior military officers from Gough Barracks but later became the home of nuns from the Sacred Heart Convent in Armagh. After the Second World War, the county leaders at Armagh County Council, who had previously held their meetings in Armagh Courthouse, decided that the courthouse was too cramped to accommodate the county council in the context of the county council's increasing administrative responsibilities, especially while the courthouse was still acting as a facility for dispensing justice, and therefore chose to acquire additional premises: the location they selected was Charlemont Place, conveniently located on the opposite side of College Hill to the courthouse, and the acquisition was completed in 1945.

After the county council was abolished in 1973, the buildings became the regional office of several government departments. As a government office the buildings became a target for potential terrorist attacks and they were damaged by a car bomb in 1989.
