= Armagh Courthouse =

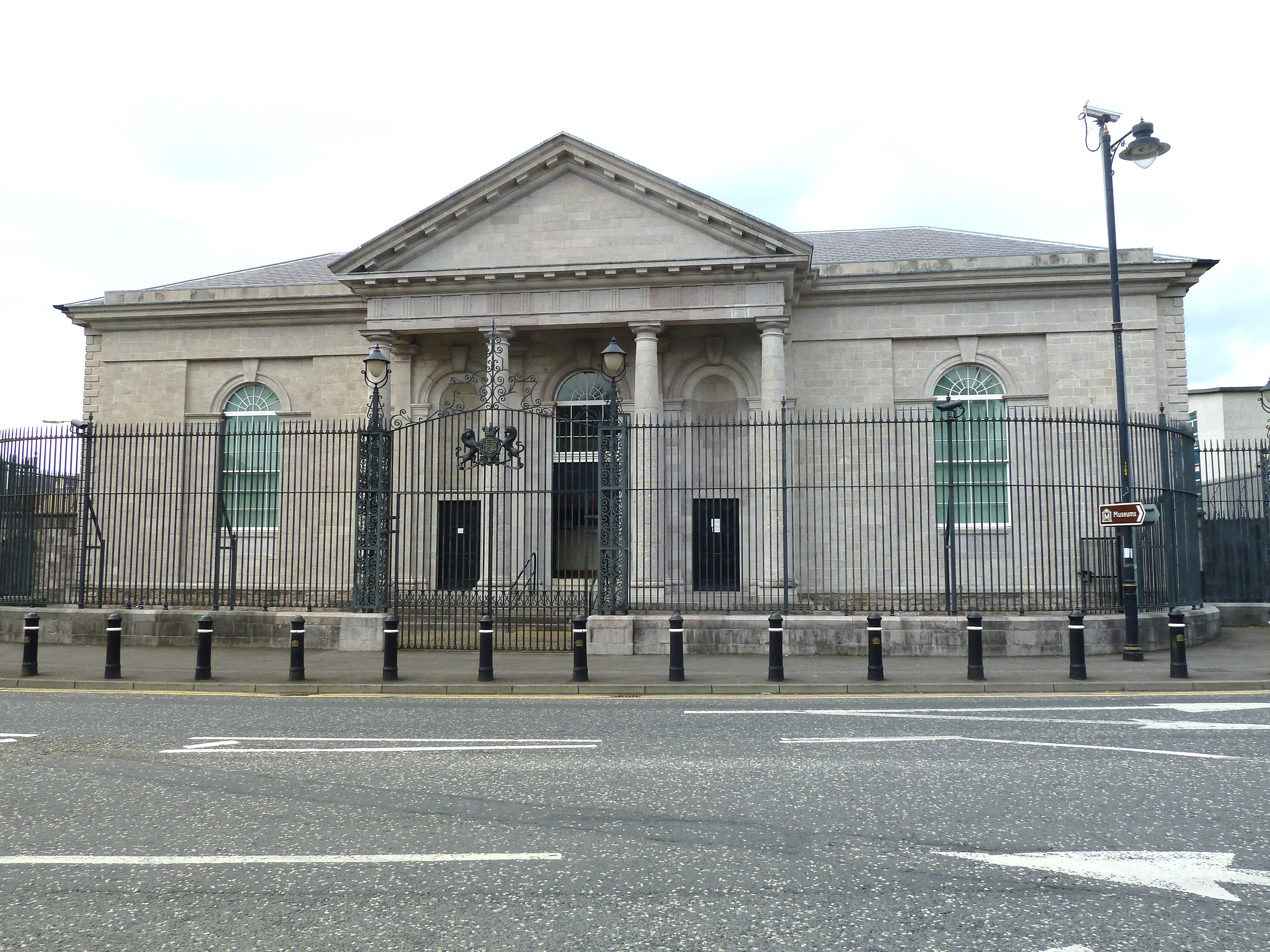
- Armagh Courthouse

- Shown in Northern Ireland
- 54.3507°N 6.6528°W
- Location: Armagh, County Armagh

History
- Built: 1809

Site notes
- Architect: Francis Johnston
- Architectural style: Neoclassical style
- Website: nidirect.gov.uk/contacts/armagh-court

Listed Building – Grade A
- Official name: Courthouse, The Mall, Armagh
- Designated: 30 April 1975
- Reference no.: HB 15/16/001

Armagh Courthouse is a judicial facility in Armagh, County Armagh, Northern Ireland. The courthouse, which accommodates hearings for the local magistrates' courts and county courts, is a Grade A listed building.

== History ==
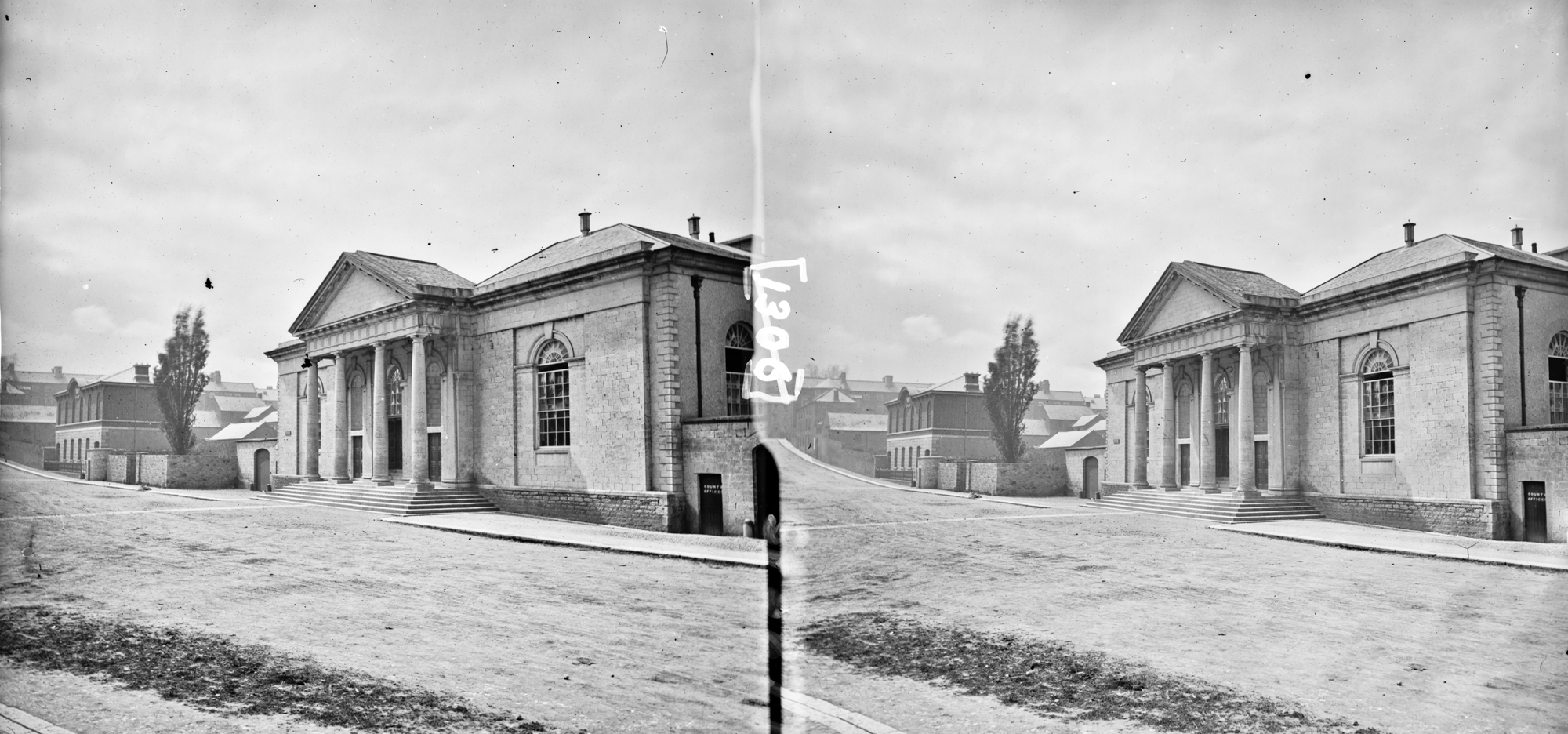
Stereo photograph, 19th century

The courthouse was commissioned to replace an earlier assizes house in Market Street. The new building, which was designed by Francis Johnston in the Neoclassical style, was built between 1806 and 1809. The design involved a symmetrical main frontage with five bays facing onto College Hill; the central section featured a tetrastyle portico with Doric order columns supporting a frieze with triglyphs and a pediment: the building was faced with Armagh limestone.

The building was originally used as a facility for dispensing justice but, following the implementation of the Local Government (Ireland) Act 1898, which established county councils in every county, it also became the meeting place for Armagh County Council. After the Second World War, county leaders decided that the courthouse was too cramped to accommodate the county council in the context of the county council's increasing administrative responsibilities, especially while the courthouse was still acting as a facility for dispensing justice, and therefore chose to move to new premises at Charlemont Place in 1945.

The courthouse underwent a complete reconstruction in the mid-1960s and by 1971 the plasterwork, staircase, balusters and most of the woodwork had been replaced. On 3 September 1993, a 1,000 lb bomb exploded directly outside the courthouse causing major structural damage to the roof, façade and walls. The main courtrooms were damaged and in the force of the blast one of the pillars was moved back a full 9 inches. An extensive programme of reconstruction and enlargement, with a new 3-storey extension added to the rear, was carried out at a cost of £8 million and the courthouse was officially re-opened by Lord Irvine, the Lord Chancellor, on 15 January 1999. The courthouse was the venue for the trial and conviction of Robert Black for the murder of Jennifer Cardy in September 2011.

In May 2012 the justice minister, David Ford, said that he accepted an inspection report recommending that the Armagh Courthouse should close in a proposed rationalisation of the court system.

== Cases ==
Petty crime cases are the main focus in Armagh Courthouse. It is also used by county court and district judges for civil case hearings.
