= List of Grade A listed buildings in County Tyrone =

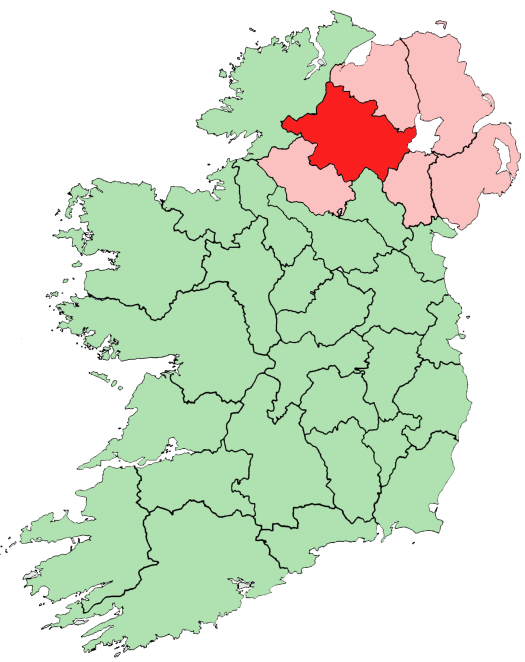
County Tyrone within Ireland

This is a list of Grade A listed buildings in County Tyrone, Northern Ireland.

In Northern Ireland, the term listed building refers to a building or other structure officially designated as being of "special architectural or historic interest". Grade A structures are those considered to be "buildings of greatest importance to Northern Ireland including both outstanding architectural set-pieces and the least altered examples of each representative style, period and type." Once listed, severe restrictions are imposed on the modifications allowed to a building's structure or its fittings. Listed building consent must be obtained from local authorities prior to any alteration to such a structure.

Listing began later in Northern Ireland than in the rest of the UK: the first provision for listing was contained in the Planning (Northern Ireland) Order 1972; and the current legislative basis for listing is the Planning (Northern Ireland) Order 1991. Under Article 42 of the Order, the relevant Department of the Northern Ireland Executive is required to compile lists of buildings of "special architectural or historic interest". Since 2016, the responsibility for the listing process rests with the Historic Environment Division of the Department for Communities (DfC).

Following the introduction of listing, an initial survey of Northern Ireland's building stock was begun in 1974. By the time of the completion of this First Survey in 1994, the listing process had developed considerably, and it was therefore decided to embark upon a Second Survey, which is still ongoing, to update and cross-check the original information. Information gathered during this survey, relating to both listed and unlisted buildings, is entered into the publicly accessible Northern Ireland Buildings Database. A range of listing criteria, which aim to define architectural and historic interest, are used to determine whether or not to list a building.

County Tyrone covers 3,155 square kilometres (1,218 sq mi), and has a population of around 166,500. The County has 20 Grade A listed buildings.

== Listed buildings ==
Building address	Grid Ref. (Note: Sometimes known as OSGB36, the grid reference is based on the British national grid reference system used by the Ordnance Survey.) Geo-coordinates	Type (Note: The type of structure, as identified by the DfC.)	Local authority	Second Survey	Original Survey	HB Number (Note: The "HB Number" is a unique number assigned to each listed building by the DfC.)	Image	Ref.
Killymoon Castle, Cookstown	54°37′47″N 6°43′39″W	Country House	Cookstown	A	B1	HB09/05/001 A	Upload Photo	
Outbuildings at Killymoon Castle, Cookstown	54°37′49″N 6°43′35″W	Farm Buildings	Cookstown	A	A	HB09/05/001 B	Upload Photo	
Augher Castle, Augher	54°25′46″N 7°08′07″W	Country House	Dungannon and South Tyrone	–	A	HB13/03/001	Upload another image See more images	
St. John's Church, Church Hill, Caledon	54°21′10″N 6°50′12″W	Church	Dungannon and South Tyrone	–	A	HB13/10/003	Upload another image	
Caledon House, Caledon	54°20′06″N 6°50′48″W	House	Dungannon and South Tyrone	–	A	HB13/10/004	Upload another image See more images	
Caledon Monument, Caledon	54°20′46″N 6°50′10″W	Memorial	Dungannon and South Tyrone	–	A	HB13/10/011	Upload Photo	
Gate Screen, Caledon Monument, Caledon	54°20′48″N 6°50′04″W	Gates/ Screens/ Lodges	Dungannon and South Tyrone	–	A	HB13/10/012	Upload Photo	
Gateway in Bawn Wall, Augher Castle, Augher		Gates/ Screens/ Lodges	Dungannon and South Tyrone	–	A	HB13/03/002	Upload Photo	
Bawn Tower, Augher Castle, Augher	54°25′44″N 7°08′30″W	Tower	Dungannon and South Tyrone	–	A	HB13/03/003	Upload Photo	
St. James Church, The Diamond, Moy	54°26′51″N 6°41′32″W	Church	Dungannon and South Tyrone	–	A	HB13/08/001	Upload another image	
St. Macartan's Cathedral, Clogher	54°24′37″N 7°10′21″W	Church	Dungannon and South Tyrone	–	A	HB13/02/001	Upload another image See more images	
Entrance gates of St. Mary's Church, Favour Royal, Augher	54°25′09″N 7°03′39″W	Gates/ Screens/ Lodges	Dungannon and South Tyrone	–	A	HB13/03/011	Upload Photo	
Clonfeacle Parish Church of St. Patrick, Benburb	54°24′41″N 6°44′28″W	Church	Dungannon and South Tyrone	–	A	HB13/11/001	Upload another image	
St. Michael's Church, Castlecaulfield	54°30′33″N 6°50′09″W	Church	Dungannon and South Tyrone	–	A	HB13/13/001 A	Upload another image See more images	
Entrance gates St. Michael's Church, Castlecaulfield	54°30′33″N 6°50′09″W	Gates/ Screens/ Lodges	Dungannon and South Tyrone	–	A	HB13/13/001 B	Upload Photo	
Burges Burial Vault, St. Michael's Church, Castlecaulfield	54°30′33″N 6°50′09″W	Mausoleum	Dungannon and South Tyrone	–	A	HB13/13/001 C	Upload Photo	
Parkanaur House, Castlecaulfield	54°29′49″N 6°51′05″W	House	Dungannon and South Tyrone	–	A	HB13/13/002	Upload another image See more images	
RC Church of The Sacred Heart, Church Street, Omagh	54°36′03″N 7°18′20″W	Church	Omagh	–	A	HB11/11/001	Upload another image See more images	
Baronscourt House, Newtownstewart	54°41′32″N 7°26′20″W	House	Strabane	–	A	HB10/04/001 A	Upload another image See more images	
