= List of Grade A listed buildings in County Fermanagh =

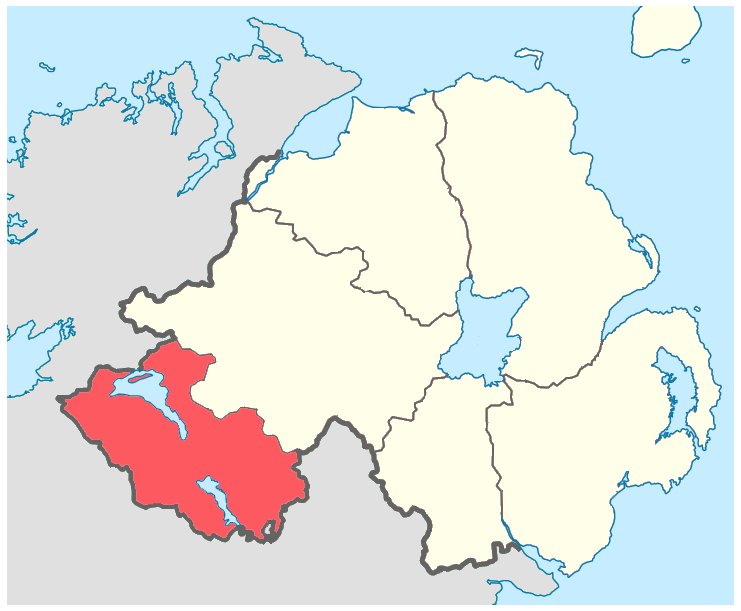
County Fermanagh within Ireland

This is a list of Grade A listed buildings in County Fermanagh, Northern Ireland.

In Northern Ireland, the term listed building refers to a building or other structure officially designated as being of "special architectural or historic interest". Grade A structures are those considered to be "buildings of greatest importance to Northern Ireland including both outstanding architectural set-pieces and the least altered examples of each representative style, period and type."

Listing began later in Northern Ireland than in the rest of the UK; the first provision for listing was contained in the Planning (Northern Ireland) Order 1972, and the current legislative basis for listing is the Planning (Northern Ireland) Order 1991. Under Article 42 of the Order, the Department of the Environment of the Northern Ireland Executive is required to compile lists of buildings of "special architectural or historic interest". The responsibility for the listing process rests with the Northern Ireland Environment Agency (NIEA), an executive agency within the Department of the Environment.

Following the introduction of listing, an initial survey of Northern Ireland's building stock was begun in 1974. By the time of the completion of this First Survey in 1994, the listing process had developed considerably, and it was therefore decided to embark upon a Second Survey to update and cross-check the original information. As of April 2010, the Second Survey had been completed for 147 of Northern Ireland's 547 council wards, and completion is anticipated by 2016. Information gathered during this survey, relating to both listed and unlisted buildings, is entered into the publicly accessible Northern Ireland Buildings Database. A range of listing criteria, which aim to define architectural and historic interest, have been developed by the NIEA, and are used to determine whether or not to list a building.

Once listed, severe restrictions are imposed on the modifications allowed to a building's structure or its fittings. Listed building consent must be obtained from local authorities prior to any alteration to such a structure. There are approximately 8,500 listed buildings in Northern Ireland, representing 2% of the total building stock. Of these, around 200 are listed at Grade A.

County Fermanagh covers 1,691 square kilometres (653 sq mi), and has a population of around 57,500. The County has nine Grade A listed buildings.

== Listed buildings ==
Building address	Grid Ref. (Note: Sometimes known as OSGB36, the grid reference is based on the British national grid reference system used by the Ordnance Survey.) Geo-coordinates	Type (Note: The type of structure, as identified by the DfC.)	Local authority	Second Survey	Original Survey	HB Number (Note: The "HB Number" is a unique number assigned to each listed building by the DfC.)	Image
Knockballymore, Magheraveely, Enniskillen	54°11′28″N 7°15′53″W	House	Fermanagh	A	B+	HB12/01/001 A	Upload Photo
Crom Castle, Newtownbutler	54°10′06″N 7°26′57″W	Country House	Fermanagh	A	A	HB12/02/002 A	Upload another image See more images
Conservatory, Colebrook Kitchen Garden, Colebrook, Brookeborough	54°20′57″N 7°22′02″W	Glass House	Fermanagh		A	HB12/04/010 A	Upload Photo
Cottage at Corry Townland, Teemore, Derrylin	54°08′22″N 7°30′58″W	House	Fermanagh	A	B1	HB12/08/013	Upload Photo
Florence Court, near Enniskillen	54°15′40″N 7°43′39″W	Country House	Fermanagh		A	HB12/09/002	Upload another image See more images
175 Boho Road, Mullylusty, Belcoo, Enniskillen	54°19′35″N 7°51′47″W	House	Fermanagh	A	A	HB12/10/002	Upload another image
St. Macartin's Cathedral, Church Street, Enniskillen	54°20′46″N 7°38′26″W	Church	Fermanagh		A	HB12/17/002	Upload another image See more images
Castle Coole, Enniskillen	54°20′10″N 7°36′11″W	Country House	Fermanagh		A	HB12/17/004	Upload another image See more images
General Cole Column, Fort Hill, Enniskillen	54°20′43″N 7°37′55″W	Memorial	Fermanagh		A	HB12/20/001	Upload another image See more images
