= List of Grade B+ listed buildings in County Armagh =

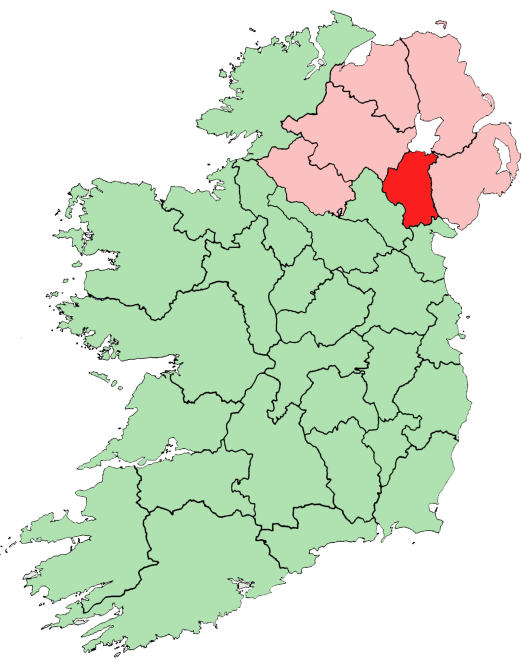
County Armagh within Ireland

This is a list of Grade B+ listed buildings in County Armagh, Northern Ireland.

In Northern Ireland, the term listed building refers to a building or other structure officially designated as being of "special architectural or historic interest". Grade B+ structures are those considered to be "buildings which might have merited grade A status but for detracting features such as an incomplete design, lower quality additions or alterations. Also included are buildings that because of exceptional features, interiors or environmental qualities are clearly above the general standard set by grade B buildings. A building may merit listing as grade B+ where its historic importance is greater than a similar building listed as grade B."

Listing began later in Northern Ireland than in the rest of the UK; the first provision for listing was contained in the Planning (Northern Ireland) Order 1972, and the current legislative basis for listing is the Planning (Northern Ireland) Order 1991. Under Article 42 of the Order, the Department of the Environment of the Northern Ireland Executive is required to compile lists of buildings of "special architectural or historic interest". The responsibility for the listing process rests with the Northern Ireland Environment Agency (NIEA), an executive agency within the Department of the Environment.

Following the introduction of listing, an initial survey of Northern Ireland's building stock was begun in 1974. By the time of the completion of this First Survey in 1994, the listing process had developed considerably, and it was therefore decided to embark upon a Second Survey to update and cross-check the original information. As of April 2010, the Second Survey had been completed for 147 of Northern Ireland's 547 council wards, and completion is anticipated by 2016. Information gathered during this survey, relating to both listed and unlisted buildings, is entered into the publicly accessible Northern Ireland Buildings Database. A range of listing criteria, which aim to define architectural and historic interest, have been developed by the NIEA, and are used to determine whether or not to list a building.

Once listed, severe restrictions are imposed on the modifications allowed to a building's structure or its fittings. Listed building consent must be obtained from local authorities prior to any alteration to such a structure. There are approximately 8,500 listed buildings in Northern Ireland, representing 2% of the total building stock. Of these, around 580 are listed at Grade B+.

County Armagh covers 1,254 square kilometres (484 sq mi), and has a population of around 160,000. The County has 48 Grade B+ listed buildings.

== Listed buildings ==
Building address	Grid Ref. (Note: Sometimes known as OSGB36, the grid reference is based on the British national grid reference system used by the Ordnance Survey.) Geo-coordinates	Type (Note: The type of structure, as identified by the DfC.)	Local authority	Second Survey	Original Survey	HB Number (Note: The "HB Number" is a unique number assigned to each listed building by the DfC.)	Image
Summer Island, 30 Summer Island Road, Annasamry, Loughgall BT61 8LF		House	Armagh		B+	HB15/01/001	Upload Photo
St Francis' Church of Ireland, Church Moss Road, Portadown, Craigavon		Church	Armagh	B+	B	HB15/02/055	Upload Photo
Gate lodges at Manor House, 33 and 35 Main Street, Loughgall, Armagh BT61 8HZ		Gates/ Screens/ Lodges	Armagh	B+	B+	HB15/02/002	Upload Photo
Main gateway of Manor House at 33 and 35 Main Street, Loughgall		Gates/ Screens/ Lodges	Armagh	B+	B+	HB15/02/003	Upload another image
Castle Dillon House, Turcarra, Armagh		House	Armagh		B+	HB15/03/001	Upload Photo
Meridian Sitings, Tullyard		Observatory	Armagh		B+	HB15/03/002	Upload Photo
Hockley Lodge, Drumilly Road, Drumnasoo, Hockley ARMAGH		House	Armagh		B+	HB15/03/009	Upload Photo
St. Aidan's Church, Salter's Grange Road, Armagh		Church	Armagh		B+	HB15/03/020	Upload Photo
Mullaghbrack House, 20 Mullurg Road, Cornacrew, Markethill		House	Armagh		B+	HB15/04/004	Upload Photo
Aqueduct Cargans/Terryhoogan Tandragee		Canal Structure	Armagh		B+	HB15/05/005	Upload Photo
Acton House Brannock, Poyntzpass, Newry BT35 6TB		House	Armagh		B+	HB15/06/011	Upload Photo
Clare Bridge, Ballyshiel Beg/Clare, Poyntzpass		Bridge	Armagh		B+	HB15/06/004	Upload Photo
Armaghbreague Church, Annvale Road, Keady		Church	Armagh		B+	HB15/08/030 A	Upload Photo
First Presbyterian Church (The Temple), Keady		Church	Armagh		B+	HB15/10/006	Upload Photo
Ballindarrang Lodge, Tynan Abbey, Corfehan		Gates/ Screens/ Lodges	Armagh		B+	HB15/11/002	Upload Photo
Knappagh House, 51 Knappagh Road, Knappagh BT60 4QB		House	Armagh		B+	HB15/12/001	Upload Photo
Orr/Sinton's Mill, Benburb		Mill	Armagh		B+	HB15/12/011	Upload Photo
St. Mark's Church, The Mall, East Armagh		Church	Armagh		B+	HB15/17/013	Upload another image See more images
Charles Shiels Institution, Tower Hill, Armagh		House	Armagh		B+	HB15/17/046	Upload Photo
Royal School, College Hill, Armagh		School	Armagh		B+	HB15/17/038	Upload another image
Boundary Wall enclosing the Inner Mall, Armagh		Walling	Armagh		B+	HB15/17/001	Upload Photo
Sovereign's House, 1 Beresford Row, The Mall, East Armagh		House	Armagh		B+	HB15/17/005	Upload another image
5 Beresford Row, The Mall, East Armagh		House	Armagh		B+	HB15/17/007	Upload Photo
10 Beresford Row, The Mall, East Armagh		House	Armagh		B+	HB15/17/009 A	Upload Photo
11 Beresford Row, The Mall, East Armagh		House	Armagh		B+	HB15/17/009 B	Upload Photo
Former Armagh Gaol, Armagh Prison, Gaol Square, Armagh		Prison	Armagh		B+	HB15/17/016	Upload another image
Armagh First Presbyterian Church, The Mall, West Armagh		Church	Armagh		B+	HB15/17/020	Upload another image
Steps, Gates, Walls and Railings of First Armagh Presbyterian Church, The Mall, West Armagh		Walling	Armagh		B+	HB15/17/020 B	Upload another image
The Mall Presbyterian Church, The Mall, West Armagh		Church	Armagh		B+	HB15/17/022	Upload another image
Trustee Savings Bank (formerly Armagh Savings Bank), 1 Victoria St., Armagh		Bank	Armagh		B+	HB15/17/042	Upload Photo
The Rokeby Obelisk, Parkmore or Demesne Armagh		Memorial	Armagh		B+	HB15/18/021	Upload Photo
Northern Bank (former) 40 Upper English St., Armagh		Bank	Armagh		B+	HB15/20/015	Upload another image
Synod Hall and Sacristy of St. Patrick's R.C. Cathedral, Cathedral Road, Armagh		Hall	Armagh		B+	HB15/20/021	Upload another image
15 Cathedral Close, Armagh		House	Armagh		B+	HB15/20/003	Upload Photo
16 Cathedral Close, Armagh		House	Armagh		B+	HB15/20/003 A	Upload Photo
36 Derrycush Road, Cloncore, Portadown BT62 1UU		House	Craigavon	B+	B1	HB14/01/001	Upload Photo
St. Patrick's R.C. Church, Aghacommon, Craigavon		Church	Craigavon		B+	HB14/03/003	Upload Photo
9 Bluestone Road, Lisnamintry, Portadown BT63 5SH		House	Craigavon	B+	B1	HB14/04/010	Upload Photo
Church of the Holy Undivided Trinity, Magheralin, Craigavon		Church	Craigavon		B+	HB14/07/013	Upload Photo
Beech Park, Ballymacateer, Lurgan		House	Craigavon		B+	HB14/07/019	Upload Photo
St. Gobhan's Church, Seagoe Road, Portadown		Church	Craigavon		B+	HB14/12/009 A	Upload another image See more images
Gates and Pillars at St. Gobhan's Church, Seagoe Road, Portadown		Gates/ Screens/ Lodges	Craigavon		B+	HB14/12/009 B	Upload Photo
Methodist Church, Thomas St., Portadown		Church	Craigavon		B+	HB14/14/013	Upload another image
Creggan Church, Creggan, Newry		Church	Newry and Mourne		B+	HB16/16/001 A	Upload another image
St. Brigid's R.C. Church, Glasdrumman, Newry		Church	Newry and Mourne		B+	HB16/16/003	Upload Photo
St. Malachy's R.C. Church, Carrickcroppan, Camlough		Church	Newry and Mourne		B+	HB16/19/003	Upload another image
St. Luke's C of I Church, Mullaghglass		Church	Newry and Mourne		B+	HB16/21/012	Upload Photo
Egyptian Arch over Camlough Road, Derrybeg, Bessbrook		Bridge	Newry and Mourne		B+	HB16/23/001	Upload another image
