= 2014 Monaghan County Council election =

Part of the 2014 Irish local elections

- 23 May 2014

All 18 seats on Monaghan County Council 10 seats needed for a majority
	First party	Second party	Third party
Party	Sinn Féin	Fine Gael	Fianna Fáil
Seats won	7	5	4
Seat change	-	-1	-1
	Fourth party
Party	Independent
Seats won	2
Seat change	-
- Map showing the area of Monaghan County Council

An election to all 18 seats on Monaghan County Council took place on 23 May 2014 as part of the 2014 Irish local elections, a decrease from 20 seats at the 2009 election. County Monaghan was divided into three local electoral areas (LEAs) to elect councillors for a five-year term of office on the electoral system of proportional representation by means of the single transferable vote (PR-STV). In addition, the town councils of Ballybay, Carrickmacross, Castleblayney, Clones and Monaghan were abolished.

New LEAs were introduced in 2013 and came into effect on 1 January 2014. The election in Ballybay–Clones local electoral area was halted when Fine Gael Councillor Owen Bannigan died suddenly while out canvassing on polling day. The election for this area was cancelled and all the ballots cast were officially destroyed. He had been expected to top the poll. It was re-run on 7 June 2014.

Sinn Féin emerged as the largest party with 7 seats, winning all the seats it contested. Fine Gael lost a seat in the Carrickmacross–Castleblayney LEA while Fianna Fáil lost a seat in Ballybay–Clones. Independents retained their 2 seats on the council.

== Results by party ==
Party	Seats	±	1st pref	FPv%	±%
Sinn Féin	7	-	9,570	34.19	
Fine Gael	5	-1	8,281	29.67	
Fianna Fáil	4	-1	6,613	23.70	
Green	0	-	113	0.40	
Independent	2	-	3,086	11.06	
Total	18	-2	27,906	100.00	—

== Results by local electoral area ==
*: Outgoing councillor.

=== Ballybay–Clones ===
Ballybay-Clones: 6 seats
Party	Candidate	FPv%	Count						
Party	Candidate	FPv%	1	2	3	4	5	6	7
Fianna Fáil	Seamus Coyle	16.3%	1,449						
Fine Gael	Ciara McPhillips	15.2%	1,348						
Sinn Féin	Cathy Bennett	14.6%	1,295						
Fine Gael	Eugene Bannigan	12.9%	1,153	1,207	1,228	1,229	1,358		
Fine Gael	Hugh McElvaney	12.1%	1,075	1,086	1,120	1,120	1,142	1,158	1,343
Sinn Féin	Pat Treanor	11.7%	1,041	1,053	1,059	1,077	1,107	1,113	1,282
Independent	Paul McPhillips	6.6%	584	608	619	620	691	724	
Fianna Fáil	Deirdre Kelly	5.6%	499	532	535	536	731	752	882
Fianna Fáil	Michael Smyth	4.5%	398	442	444	445			
Independent	Joseph Duffy	0.3%	27	27	27	27			
Green	Raimonda Leonaviciene	0.3%	22	22	22	22			
Electorate: 15,326 Valid: 8,891 Spoilt: 73 Quota: 1,271 Turnout: 8,964 (58.5%)

=== Carrickmacross–Castleblayney ===
Carrickmacross-Castleblayney: 6 seats
Party	Candidate	FPv%	Count							
Party	Candidate	FPv%	1	2	3	4	5	6	7	8
Sinn Féin	Matt Carthy	19.3%	1,970							
Fine Gael	Aidan Campbell	13.3%	1,355	1,365	1,366	1,416	1,554			
Sinn Féin	Noel Keelan	12.8%	1,304	1,545						
Fianna Fáil	P.J. O'Hanlon	10.9%	1,118	1,158	1,166	1,191	1,355	1,479		
Sinn Féin	Jackie Crowe	9.9%	1,019	1,106	1,159	1,214	1,277	1,308	1,349	1,350
Fianna Fáil	Pádraig McNally	9.3%	948	985	997	1,014	1,263	1,399	1,443	1,455
Fine Gael	Aidan Murray	9.1%	928	950	953	971	991	1,325	1,334	1,340
Fianna Fáil	Margaret Conlon	6.8%	691	705	706	717				
Fine Gael	Lorraine Cotter	6.3%	638	682	688	729	771			
Labour	Ciarán Connolly	1.4%	145	151	152					
Labour	Peadar Markey	0.9%	98	107	107					
Electorate: 16,958 Valid: 10,214 Spoilt: 165 Quota: 1,460 Turnout: 10,379 (61.2%)

=== Monaghan ===
Monaghan: 6 seats
Party	Candidate	FPv%	Count							
Party	Candidate	FPv%	1	2	3	4	5	6	7	8
Sinn Féin	Brian McKenna	15.2%	1,336							
Independent	Seamus Treanor	15.1%	1,332							
Fianna Fáil	Robbie Gallagher	14.1%	1,244	1,249	1,259					
Sinn Féin	Seán Conlon	11.2%	988	1,012	1,025	1,044	1,062	1,122	1,159	1,233
Fine Gael	David Maxwell	8.8%	775	776	780	789	806	828	992	1,318
Independent	Paudge Connolly	8.3%	727	738	751	787	853	953	1,048	1,198
Sinn Féin	Siobhán Cheung	7%	617	642	649	668	690	725	765	807
Fine Gael	Barra Flynn	5.9%	525	527	531	546	579	611	760	
Fine Gael	Garry Keenan	5.5%	484	487	490	511	525	553		
Independent	Thomas Hagan	3.5%	306	307	321	348	369			
Fianna Fáil	John Finn	3%	266	270	272	276				
Green	Grazvydas Vaitekunas	1%	91	92	93					
Independent	Kevin Hamill	0.8%	68	69	71					
Independent	Jimmy Mee	0.5%	42	42	43					
Electorate: 16,211 Valid: 8,801 Spoilt: 138 Quota: 1,258 Turnout: 8,939 (55.14%)

== Changes ==
=== Co-options ===
Party	Outgoing	LEA	Reason	Date	Co-optee
Sinn Féin	Matt Carthy	Carrickmacross–Castleblayney	Elected for Midlands–North-West at the European Parliament election	8 July 2014	Colm Carthy
Fine Gael	Eugene Bannigan	Ballybay–Clones	Resignation.	25 September 2015	Seán Gilliland
Fianna Fáil	Robbie Gallagher	Monaghan	Elected to 25th Seanad at the 2016 Seanad election.	1 July 2016	Raymond Aughey
Fine Gael	Ciara McPhillips	Ballybay-Clones	Resigned to prioritise work as a solicitor	16 June 2017	Eva Humphreys
Fine Gael	Eva Humphreys	Ballybay-Clones	Resigned to prioritise work as a solicitor	December 2018	Richard Truell

=== Changes in affiliation ===
Name	LEA	Elected as	New affiliation	Date
Hugh McElvaney	Ballybay–Clones	Fine Gael	Independent	24 November 2015
