= 2019 Monaghan County Council election =

Part of the 2019 Irish local elections

- 24 May 2019

All 18 seats on Monaghan County Council 10 seats needed for a majority
	First party	Second party	Third party
Party	Sinn Féin	Fine Gael	Fianna Fáil
Seats won	6	5	4
Seat change	▼1	Steady	Steady
	Fourth party
Party	Independent
Seats won	3
Seat change	▲1
- Results by local electoral area

An election to all 18 seats on Monaghan County Council was held on 24 May 2019 as part of the 2019 Irish local elections. County Monaghan was divided into 3 local electoral areas (LEAs) to elect councillors for a five-year term of office on the electoral system of proportional representation by means of the single transferable vote (PR-STV).

== Boundary review ==
Following the recommendations of the 2018 LEA boundary review committee, the boundaries to the LEAs used in the 2014 elections were adjusted with the move of one seat from Ballybay–Clones LEA to Monaghan LEA.

== Overview ==
Bucking a trend elsewhere Sinn Féin slightly increased their vote in County Monaghan. However this did not prevent the party from losing a seat in the Carrickmacross–Castleblayney LEA but Sinn Féin would still remain the largest party. The Sinn Féin loss was to former Carrickmacross town councillor, Mary Kerr-Conlon. However the Fine Gael vote in County Monaghan fell by over 5%, a consequence of Hugh McElvaney retaining his seat in Ballybay-Clones as an Independent.

== Results by party ==
Party	Seats	±	1st pref	FPv%	±%
Sinn Féin	6	▼1	9,238	34.38	▲0.19
Fine Gael	5	Steady	6,568	24.44	▼5.23
Fianna Fáil	4	Steady	6,609	24.60	▲0.90
Green	0	Steady	676	2.52	▲2.12
Aontú	0	Steady	354	1.32	New
Independent	3	▲1	3,425	12.75	▲1.69
Total	18	Steady	26,870	100.00	Steady

== Results by local electoral area ==
*: Outgoing councillor elected in 2014.
†: Outgoing councillor coopted subsequent to the 2014 election.

=== Ballybay–Clones ===
Ballybay–Clones: 5 seats
Party	Candidate	FPv%	Count		
Party	Candidate	FPv%	1	2	3
Fianna Fáil	Séamus Coyle	28.57%	2,346		
Sinn Féin	Pat Treanor	17.40%	1,429		
Fine Gael	Richard John Truell	15.89%	1,305	1,525	
Fine Gael	Séan Gilliland	14.42%	1,184	1,412	
Independent	Hugh McElvaney	13.87%	1,139	1,357	1,419
Sinn Féin	Rosie Smyth O'Harte	9.84%	808	1,119	1,213
Electorate: 14,767 Valid: 8,211 Spoilt: 168 Quota: 1,369 Turnout: 8,379 (57%)

=== Carrickmacross–Castleblayney ===
Carrickmacross–Castleblayney: 6 seats
Party	Candidate	FPv%	Count						
Party	Candidate	FPv%	1	2	3	4	5	6	7
Sinn Féin	Colm Carthy	14.60%	1,401						
Sinn Féin	Noel Keelan	14.34%	1,376						
Fine Gael	Aidan Campbell	14.22%	1,364	1,365	1,401				
Fianna Fáil	P.J. O'Hanlon	14.03%	1,346	1,350	1,372				
Sinn Féin	Jackie Crowe	9.87%	947	961	1,005	1,108	1,129	1,173	
Fine Gael	Mary Kerr-Conlon	7.84%	752	755	796	813	1,024	1,237	1,247
Fianna Fáil	Aoife McCooey	7.66%	735	736	765	868	905	1,192	1,197
Fianna Fáil	Rory Owen McEvoy	6.42%	616	620	642	677	748		
Fine Gael	Patrick Cassidy	4.28%	411	412	432	441			
Aontú	James Duffy	3.69%	354	354	378				
Green	Conan Connolly	3.03%	291	293					
Electorate: 17,286 Valid: 9,593 Spoilt: 192 Quota: 1,371 Turnout: 9,785 (57%)

=== Monaghan ===
Monaghan: 7 seats
Party	Candidate	FPv%	Count										
Party	Candidate	FPv%	1	2	3	4	5	6	7	8	9	10	11
Sinn Féin	Cathy Bennett	14.24%	1,291										
Independent	Seamus Treanor	12.71%	1,152										
Fianna Fáil	Raymond Aughey	12.03%	1,091	1,107	1,109	1,116	1,131	1,151					
Sinn Féin	Brian McKenna	9.91%	898	951	953	954	967	977	1,003	1,004	1,033	1,146	
Fine Gael	David Maxwell	9.39%	851	854	855	855	856	868	942	944	987	1,003	1,281
Independent	Paudge Connolly	8.10%	734	747	751	757	770	816	839	840	922	990	1,082
Sinn Féin	Seán Conlon	7.49%	679	711	713	718	753	783	795	798	844	1,018	1,074
Fianna Fáil	Emer Brennan	5.24%	475	483	484	487	491	506	531	536	602	623	673
Fine Gael	Barra Flynn	4.80%	435	439	440	444	449	462	524	526	589	595	
Sinn Féin	Catriona Moen	4.51%	409	420	421	421	432	441	456	456	480		
Green	Mícheál Callaghan	4.25%	385	392	393	397	417	428	445	446			
Fine Gael	Fiona McCaffrey Jones	2.93%	266	269	269	271	272	280					
Independent	Thomas Hagan	2.04%	185	188	190	203	225						
Independent	Alvin McGlone	1.69%	153	153	157	163							
Independent	Paddy Grenham	0.44%	40	40	40								
Independent	James Mee	0.24%	22	23	23								
Electorate: 18,421 Valid: 9,066 Spoilt: 206 Quota: 1,134 Turnout: 9,272 (50%)

== Results by gender ==
2019 Monaghan County Council election Candidates by gender
Gender	Number of candidates	% of candidates	Elected councillors	% of councillors
Men	26	78.8%	15	83.3%
Women	7	21.2%	3	16.7%
TOTAL	33		18	
