= 2004 Monaghan County Council election =

Part of the 2004 Irish local elections

- 11 June 2004

All 20 seats on Monaghan County Council
	First party	Second party	Third party
Party	Sinn Féin	Fine Gael	Fianna Fáil
Seats won	7	7	5
Seat change	+1	+1	-3
	Fourth party
Party	Independent
Seats won	1
Seat change	+1
- Map showing the area of Monaghan County Council
Council control after election
TBD

An election to Monaghan County Council took place on 11 June 2004 as part of that year's Irish local elections. 20 councillors were elected from four local electoral areas (LEAs) for a five-year term of office on the electoral system of proportional representation by means of the single transferable vote (PR-STV).

== Results by party ==
Party	Seats	±	First Pref. votes	FPv%	±%
Sinn Féin	7	+1	9,332	31.05	
Fine Gael	7	+1	8,982	29.89	
Fianna Fáil	5	-3	8,826	29.37	
Independent	1	+1	2,913	9.69	
Totals	20	-	30,053	100.00	—

== Results by local electoral area ==
=== Carrickmacross ===
Carrickmacross - 5 seats
Party	Candidate	FPv%	Count							
Party	Candidate	FPv%	1	2	3	4	5	6	7	8
Sinn Féin	Matt Carthy	17.77	1,408							
Fianna Fáil	Pádraig McNally*	16.86	1,336							
Sinn Féin	Noel Keelan*	12.75	1,010	1,031	1,094	1,150	1,174	1,176	1,239	1,300
Independent	Vincent P. Martin	11.08	878	893	901	979	1,066	1,068	1,179	1,371
Fine Gael	John Keenan	8.14	645	650	652	662	813	814	841	1,248
Fine Gael	Aidan Murray*	7.83	620	644	645	689	807	808	839	
Fianna Fáil	Rosaleen O'Hanlon*	7.19	570	607	610	636	655	659	968	1,026
Fianna Fáil	Shane O'Hanlon*	6.65	527	570	573	614	651	656		
Fine Gael	Denis Durcan	5.36	425	431	434	466				
Independent	Tom Freeman	3.85	305	337	341					
Fianna Fáil	Brian Connolly	2.51	199							
Electorate: 11,094 Valid: 7,923 (71.42%) Spoilt: 194 Quota: 1,321 Turnout: 8,117 (73.17%)

=== Castleblayney ===
Castleblayney - 5 seats
Party	Candidate	FPv%	Count				
Party	Candidate	FPv%	1	2	3	4	5
Sinn Féin	Jackie Crowe*	19.52	1,415				
Fine Gael	Owen Bannigan*	17.84	1,293				
Fianna Fáil	John O'Brien*	15.66	1,135	1,165	1,176	1,295	
Fine Gael	Gary Carville*	15.34	1,112	1,159	1,207	1,458	
Fianna Fáil	Seamus Coyle	10.70	951	976	992	1,090	1,167
Fianna Fáil	Brendan Hughes*	9.50	751	793	795	884	946
Independent	Joe Brennan	3.39	591	653	660		
Electorate: 10,701 Valid: 7,248 (67.73%) Spoilt: 91 Quota: 1,209 Turnout: 7,339 (68.58%)

=== Clones ===
Clones - 4 seats
Party	Candidate	FPv%	Count			
Party	Candidate	FPv%	1	2	3	4
Fine Gael	Hugh McElvaney*	19.16	1,154	1,233		
Fine Gael	Heather Humphreys*	18.11	1,091	1,145	1,161	1,195
Sinn Féin	Pat Treanor	14.05	846	951	1,437	
Independent	Brendan Casey	16.93	795	872	978	1,093
Sinn Féin	Sheila McKenna*	13.97	730	753		
Fianna Fáil	Benny Kieran	11.65	723	1,035	1,123	1,206
Fianna Fáil	Eugene McCaughey	8.68	684			
Electorate: 8,859 Valid: 6,023 (67.99%) Spoilt: 123 Quota: 1,205 Turnout: 6,146 (69.38%)

=== Monaghan ===
Monaghan - 6 seats
Party	Candidate	FPv%	Count					
Party	Candidate	FPv%	1	2	3	4	5	6
Sinn Féin	Seán Conlon*	16.13	1,429					
Fianna Fáil	Robbie Gallagher	15.72	1,393					
Sinn Féin	Brian McKenna*	15.37	1,362					
Sinn Féin	Brenda McAnespie*	12.78	1,132	1,261	1,276			
Fine Gael	David Maxwell	11.95	1,059	1,068	1,080	1,112	1,118	1,236
Fine Gael	Pat McKenna*	10.20	904	908	915	1,001	1,035	1,198
Fine Gael	Eugene Sherry	7.66	679	684	693	734	765	870
Fianna Fáil	Emer Brennan	6.29	557	566	645	708	733	
Independent	Plunkett McKenna	3.88	344	351	356			
Electorate: 14,669 Valid: 8,859 (60.39%) Spoilt: 262 Quota: 1,266 Turnout: 9,121 (62.18%)
