= 2009 Monaghan County Council election =

Part of the 2009 Irish local elections

- 5 June 2009

20 seats on Monaghan County Council
	First party	Second party	Third party
Party	Sinn Féin	Fine Gael	Fianna Fáil
Seats won	7	6	5
Seat change	-	-1	-
	Fourth party
Party	Independent
Seats won	2
Seat change	+1
- Map showing the area of Monaghan County Council
Council control after election
TBD

An election to Monaghan County Council took place on 5 June 2009 as part of that year's Irish local elections. 20 councillors were elected from four local electoral areas (LEAs) for a five-year term of office on the electoral system of proportional representation by means of the single transferable vote (PR-STV).

== Results by party ==
Party	Seats	±	First Pref. votes	FPv%	±%
Sinn Féin	7	-	8,865	27.13	
Fine Gael	6	-1	9,577	29.31	
Fianna Fáil	5	-	9,365	28.66	
Independent	2	+1	3,475	10.63	
Totals	20	-	32,576	100.00	—

== Results by local electoral area ==
=== Carrickmacross ===
Carrickmacross - 5 seats
Party	Candidate	FPv%	Count							
Party	Candidate	FPv%	1	2	3	4	5	6	7	8
Fianna Fáil	Pádraig McNally*	15.81	1,343	1,373	1,468					
Sinn Féin	Matt Carthy*	15.32	1,302	1,369	1,459					
Sinn Féin	Noel Keelan*	14.49	1,231	1,254	1,292	1,297	1,317	1,511		
Fine Gael	John Keenan*	11.21	952	996	1,029	1,033	1,036	1,086	1,190	1,215
Fine Gael	Aidan Murray	10.68	907	949	1,028	1,036	1,041	1,092	1,257	1,271
Green	Vincent P. Martin*	7.93	674	716	760	769	773	832		
Fianna Fáil	Owen Greene	7.85	667	684	711	716	718			
Fianna Fáil	P.J. O'Hanlon	7.52	639	661	698	718	726	1,007	1,185	1,238
Independent	Tom Freeman	5.14	437	470						
Labour	Peadar Markey	4.05	344							
Electorate: 11,729 Valid: 8,496 (72.44%) Spoilt: 111 Quota: 1,417 Turnout: 8,607 (73.38%)

=== Castleblayney ===
Castleblayney - 4 seats
Party	Candidate	FPv%	Count		
Party	Candidate	FPv%	1	2	3
Fianna Fáil	John O'Brien*	26.79	1,949		
Fine Gael	Owen Bannigan*	21.21	1,543		
Sinn Féin	Jackie Crowe*	21.08	1,534		
Fine Gael	Gary Carville*	17.21	1,252	1,419	1,493
Fianna Fáil	Brendan Hughes*	13.24	998	1,324	1,337
Independent	Joe Brennan	3.39	591	653	660
Electorate: 10,636 Valid: 7,276 (68.41%) Spoilt: 109 Quota: 1,456 Turnout: 7,385 (69.43%)

=== Clones ===
Clones - 4 seats
Party	Candidate	FPv%	Count				
Party	Candidate	FPv%	1	2	3	4	5
Fine Gael	Heather Humphreys*	23.92	1,554				
Sinn Féin	Pat Treanor*	22.12	1,437				
Fianna Fáil	Seamus Coyle*	18.84	1,224	1,250	1,272	1,295	1,415
Fine Gael	Hugh McElvaney*	18.40	1,195	1,388			
Fianna Fáil	Benny Kieran	11.19	727	744	789	816	944
Independent	John Connolly	16.93	359	377	447	483	
Electorate: 9,256 Valid: 6,496 (70.18%) Spoilt: 104 Quota: 1,300 Turnout: 6,600 (71.31%)

=== Monaghan ===
Monaghan - 7 seats
Party	Candidate	FPv%	Count									
Party	Candidate	FPv%	1	2	3	4	5	6	7	8	9	10
Independent	Seamus Treanor	13.24	1,300									
Sinn Féin	Brian McKenna*	12.77	1,254									
Fianna Fáil	Robbie Gallagher*	12.04	1,182	1,191	1,266							
Sinn Féin	Seán Conlon*	10.79	1,059	1,074	1,080	1,198	1,200	1,268				
Fine Gael	David Maxwell*	11.95	1,049	1,057	1,060	1,066	1,067	1,120	1,126	1,127	1,327	
Independent	Paudge Connolly	13.24	788	801	834	864	869	963	976	979	1,053	1,167
Sinn Féin	Sheila McKenna	12.78	737	742	751	850	851	868	878	894	923	1,070
Fine Gael	Pat McKenna*	10.20	701	705	749	755	759	784	788	793	887	939
Fine Gael	Patrick Gilsenan	7.66	424	428	432	448	448	481	487	487		
Fianna Fáil	Ita O'Hara	6.29	401	404	443	453	477	509	510	511	539	
Green	Christina Cassidy	6.29	376	382	389	399	400					
Sinn Féin	Malachy Trainor	6.29	311	315	321							
Fianna Fáil	Eugene Treanor	6.29	235	236								
Electorate: 15,791 Valid: 9,817 (62.17%) Spoilt: 167 Quota: 1,228 Turnout: 9,984 (63.23%)
