= McAnespie =

McAnespie is a surname. Notable people with the surname include:

- Aidan McAnespie (1965–1988), Irish Catholic killed during The Troubles
- Alex McAnespie, Scottish football player and manager
- Brenda McAnespie (born 1966), Irish ladies' Gaelic football player
- Kieran McAnespie (born 1979), Scottish footballer
- Ryan McAnespie, Irish Gaelic football player
- Steve McAnespie (born 1972), Scottish footballer
