= 2024 Monaghan County Council election =

Part of the 2024 Irish local elections

- 7 June 2024

All 18 seats on Monaghan County Council 10 seats needed for a majority
	First party	Second party
Party	Sinn Féin	Fine Gael
Last election	6	5
Seats won	8	6
Seat change	▲2	▲1
	Third party	Fourth party
Party	Fianna Fáil	Independent
Last election	4	3
Seats won	3	1
Seat change	▼1	▼2
- Results by Local Electoral Area

An election to all 18 seats on Monaghan County Council was held on 7 June 2024 as part of the 2024 Irish local elections. County Monaghan is divided into 3 local electoral areas (LEAs) to elect councillors for a five-year term of office on the electoral system of proportional representation by means of the single transferable vote (PR-STV).

== Retiring incumbents ==
The following councillors did not seek re-election:

Constituency	Councillor	Party
Monaghan	Brian McKenna	Sinn Féin
Ballybay –Clones	Hugh McElvaney	Independent

== Results by party ==
Party	Candidates	Seats	±	1st pref	FPv%	±%
Sinn Féin	10	8	+2	9,947	35.21	+0.83
Fine Gael	6	6	+1	7,119	25.20	+0.76
Fianna Fáil	8	3	-1	6,739	23.85	-0.45
Aontú	2	0	-	932	3.30	+1.98
Green	2	0	-	538	1.90	-0.62
Irish Freedom	1	0	-	422	1.49	new
Independent	7	1	-2	2,556	9.05	-3.70
Total	36	18	Steady	28,253	100.00	

=== Analysis of election ===
Monaghan proved to be a success story for Sinn Féin as the party re-captured a seat in Carrickmacross-Castleblayney from Fianna Fáil which they had lost at the last local election in 2019 and Sinn Féin also took a second seat in Ballybay-Clones with the retirement of the outgoing Independent, Hughie McElvaney to emerge as the largest party with 8 seats. Independent and former TD, Paudge Connolly, also lost his seat in the Monaghan LEA to Fine Gael who increased their numbers to 7. Fianna Fáil declined further to just 3 seats in number.

== Results by LEA ==
*: Outgoing councillor elected in 2019.
†: Outgoing councillor coopted subsequent to the 2019 election.

=== Ballybay–Clones ===
Ballybay–Clones: 5 seats
Party	Candidate	FPv%	Count					
Party	Candidate	FPv%	1	2	3	4	5	6
Fianna Fáil	Seamus Coyle	19.67%	1,665					
Fine Gael	Ricard Truell	18.66%	1,579					
Fine Gael	Seán Gilliland	14.34%	1,214	1,301	1,410	1,444		
Sinn Féin	Sinéad Flynn	14.03%	1,187	1,219	1,228	1,259	1,330	1,459
Sinn Féin	Pat Treanor	12.77%	1,081	1,095	1,109	1,188	1,233	1,355
Aontú	Olivia Larkin	7.37%	624	638	651	671	836	965
Irish Freedom	Mark Brady	4.99%	422	441	444	448		
Fianna Fáil	Martina Durkan	4.93%	417	469	482	586	622	
Fianna Fáil	John Connolly	3.24%	274	310	317			
Electorate: 15,264 Valid: 8,463 Spoilt: 98 Quota: 1,411 Turnout: 8,561 (56.09%)

=== Carrickmacross–Castleblayney ===
Carrickmacross–Castleblayney: 6 seats
Party	Candidate	FPv%	Count							
Party	Candidate	FPv%	1	2	3	4	5	6	7	8
Fianna Fáil	PJ O'Hanlon	14.84%	1,478							
Fine Gael	Aidan Campbell	14.02%	1,396	1,400	1,421	1,526				
Sinn Féin	Colm Carthy	13.67%	1,362	1,368	1,394	1,456				
Sinn Féin	Noel Keelan	12.00%	1,195	1,201	1,215	1,227	1,230	1,306	1,687	
Fine Gael	Peter Conlon	9.77%	973	985	996	1,061	1,078	1,137	1,222	1,251
Sinn Féin	Paul Gibbons	9.26%	922	922	949	987	998	1,042	1,198	1,416
Sinn Féin	Aoife Kindlon	7.00%	697	700	708	738	740	797		
Fianna Fáil	Aoife McCooey	6.50%	647	667	690	786	828	876	931	948
Independent	Seamus Hanratty	5.40%	538	539	633	663	663			
Green	Tate Donnelly	4.46%	444	446	470					
Aontú	James Duffy	3.09%	308	309						
Electorate: 18,438 Valid: 9,960 Spoilt: 111 Quota: 1,423 Turnout: 10,071 (54.62%)

=== Monaghan ===
Monaghan: 7 Seats
Party	Candidate	FPv%	Count						
Party	Candidate	FPv%	1	2	3	4	5	6	7
Sinn Féin	Cathy Bennett	12.53%	1,232						
Fianna Fáil	Raymond Aughey	11.42%	1,123	1,135	1,156	1,315			
Independent	Seamus Treanor	10.97%	1,078	1,110	1,198	1,251			
Sinn Féin	Seán Conlan	8.76%	861	879	892	906	908	1,164	1,250
Fine Gael	Pauric Clerkin	10.24%	1,007	1,028	1,032	1,064	1,073	1,097	1,218
Sinn Féin	Bronagh McAree	7.87%	774	789	795	808	813	1,043	1,195
Fine Gael	David Maxwell	9.66%	950	971	979	1,009	1,017	1,049	1,163
Fianna Fáil	Brian 'Beano' Clerkin	7.11%	699	713	720	782	828	847	936
Independent	Paudge Connolly	6.35%	624	649	669	717	731	792	
Sinn Féin	Niamh McCooey	6.47%	636	648	657	681	683		
Fianna Fáil	Eamon Treanor	4.44%	436	441	445				
Independent	Colin Walker	1.81%	178	204					
Green	Deividas Pauliukonis	0.96%	94						
Independent	Denis O'Higgins	0.66%	65						
Independent	Paddy Grenham	0.61%	60						
Independent	Jimmy 'Stavrous' Mee	0.13%	13						
Electorate: 19,207 Valid: 9,830 Spoilt: 143 Quota: 1,229 Turnout: 9,973 (51.92%)

== Changes ==
=== Co-options ===
Party	Outgoing	LEA	Reason	Date	Co-optee
Fine Gael	David Maxwell	Monaghan	Elected to 34th Dáil at the 2024 general election	12 December 2024	Alan Johnston
Sinn Féin	Cathy Bennett	Monaghan	Elected to 34th Dáil at the 2024 general election	16 December 2024	Niamh McCooey
Fianna Fáil	Seamus Coyle	Ballybay–Clones	Death.	8 October 2026	Margaret Conlon
