= Hughie McElvaney =

Irish politician and businessman (1949–2025)

Monaghan County Councillor
- In office 2014–2024
- Constituency: Ballybay-Clones
- In office 1974 – June 2014
- Constituency: Clones

Personal details
- Born: 1949
- Died: 1 October 2025 (aged 75–76) Cavan, County Cavan, Ireland
- Party: Independent
- Other political affiliations: Fine Gael (before 2015)
- Profession: Businessman

Hugh McElvaney (1949 – 1 October 2025) was an Irish businessman and politician. He was involved with waste management firms across several jurisdictions, with a turnover valued at over €16 million per annum. He was a member of Monaghan County Council, elected originally for Fine Gael but then ran as an independent, representing the Ballybay-Clones Electoral Area since its establishment from the 2014 election onwards, however McElvaney did not run for re-election in the 2024 Monaghan County Council election.

== Electoral history ==
McElvaney stood as a candidate for Fine Gael in the Cavan–Monaghan at the November 1982 Irish general election, but was not elected. He established himself as a Fine Gael stalwart in Monaghan. He was Mayor of Monaghan four times and was elected to Monaghan County Council on ten occasions, including topping the poll in 1999 and 2004, on the latter occasion finishing ahead of party colleague Heather Humphreys, a future Member of Cabinet.

In November 2015, McElvaney resigned from Fine Gael in protest at how the party dealt with the North/South Electricity Interconnector issue in Cavan and Monaghan, specifically in relation to the perceived lack of engagement by Heather Humphreys with the local Anti-Pylon Committee. McElvaney was then elected as an independent in the 2019 Monaghan County Council election, however in the 2024 Monaghan County Council election McElvaney did not contest his seat.

== Aer Lingus incident ==
In May 1996, while on an official five day visit by Monaghan County Council to the twinned province of Prince Edward Island in Canada, McElvaney was cautioned by airport police in Boston after he was alleged to have been disruptive on an Aer Lingus flight and became abusive to airline staff after being refused alcoholic drinks. In a written statement, McElvaney admitted he had been involved in a regrettable "incident" during the flight and wished to "apologise unreservedly for any offence caused by me to my fellow passengers or to Aer Lingus staff". On their return to Dublin Airport, some of his County Council colleagues were quoted as being embarrassed by McElvaney's behaviour, however Fianna Fáil councillor Willie McKenna downplayed the incident and said he believed the entire episode was blown out of all proportion by the media.

== RTÉ Investigates programme ==
McElvaney was one of three politicians secretly filmed for RTÉ Investigates: Standards in Public Office, which aired straight after the Nine O'Clock News on 8 December 2015. For the purposes of its programme, RTÉ established an imaginary company it named Vinst Opportunities, with imaginary investors searching for ways to set up wind farms without having to deal with any problems that might arise if the imaginary company and its imaginary investors sought planning permission. Discovering that he directed a consultancy company which was absent from his public declaration of financial interests, a declaration which also did not include a farm, houses and commercial property on 12 February 2015 (one day after McElvaney made requests for planning permission at two of these sites - one for a housing development and the other for a storage facility), RTÉ contacted McElvaney.

McElvaney was then cold called by an imaginary representative of the imaginary foreign investment firm, using the name "Nina Carlson", who secretly recorded the phone call. McElvaney humorously asked the imaginary company representative: "Are you going to pay me by the hour or the job?" As the imaginary representative arranged a meeting with other imaginary representatives, McElvaney was recorded sarcastically saying: "And you will have plenty of sterling with you? You need to sweeten the man up. You know what I mean." When asked for a specific amount of money, McElvaney responded: "Ten grand would be a start." McElvaney advised the imaginary representative that secrecy would be necessary: "The more that's in the bag, the keener I will be. Don't tell anybody else our terms and conditions".

At a subsequent face-to-face meeting in a local hotel, McElvaney was recorded on video as saying he was "only fooling" that he was looking for £10,000, however he went onto say he wanted "loads of money" if the project was a success, adding: "I am the conduit between your investment company and Monaghan County Council. And I am also the conduit between you and the people where you intend building".

McElvaney responded immediately before and after RTÉ's airing of its programme by claiming he knew it was a sting from the outset and that he was eager to play along. He claimed he did not immediately end the initial phone call because he wanted to expose whoever was behind the dirty tricks campaign against him.

His fellow councillors voted to oust him at a meeting arranged especially to respond to the programme but McElvaney refused to leave. A parody of the affair - combining McElvaney's words ("Money. Sterling. Money. Sterling". "I want loads of money"), hand gestures and body movements with the "Macarena" song - quickly went viral.

== Standards in Public Office investigation ==
In April 2018, the Standards in Public Office Commission (SIPO) announced that McElvaney would face an ethics hearing that September as part of its response to the programme, to determine if he had contravened provisions of the Local Government Act 2001 and the Code of Conduct for Councillors. McElvaney was the last of the three councillors called before the hearing. In March 2019, the Commission announced its results concerning the other two politicians featured on the programme.

In September 2019, the High Court in Dublin dismissed a judicial review launched by McElvaney in an effort to prevent the SIPO investigation from proceeding, citing the inability of his legal team to cross-examine the fictitious "Nina Carlson" regarding his claim of being entrapped by RTE. Trial judge Mr Justice Garrett Simons ruled that what the reporter said to McElvaney during their interactions were irrelevant, as it was accepted that what she said was fictitious. However, the response of the McElvaney to what was said, specifically if it "amounted to a request for remuneration or reward for anything to be done by virtue of his office as an elected member", was relevant to the SIPO investigation, thus the court dismissed the application in its entirety.

In January 2020, SIPO released a report that concluded McElvaney had breached ethics laws and also failed to uphold the Code of Conduct for Councillors during his interactions with the fictitious "Nina Carlson", specifically by using his position as county councillor to promote his private business interests in return for a financial reward. The report highlighted the significant fact that it was McElvaney himself who initiated the discussion of financial terms in return for his assistance to the fictitious investment company. Despite SIPO's findings, it subsequently emerged that it had no power to impose penalties on individuals who were found to have breached regulations.

== Tax default ==
In March 2018, Revenue named McElvaney on its tax defaulter list after he under-declared a sum of €48,041.29 in taxes.

== Death ==
McElvaney died at Cavan General Hospital on 1 October 2025.
