= Monaghan Courthouse =

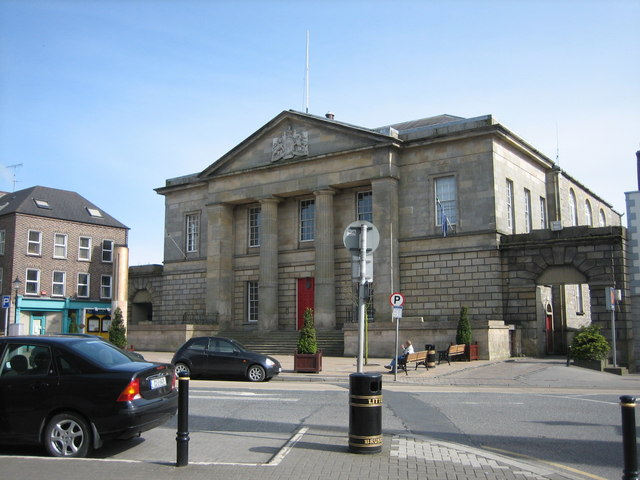
- Monaghan Courthouse

- Location within Ireland

General information
- Architectural style: Neoclassical style
- Location: Monaghan, County Monaghan, Ireland
- Coordinates: 54.2476°N 6.9701°W
- Completed: 1827

Design and construction
- Architect: Joseph Welland

Monaghan Courthouse is a judicial facility in Monaghan, County Monaghan, Ireland

== History ==
The courthouse, which was designed by Joseph Welland in the neoclassical style and built in ashlar stone, was completed in 1827. The design involved a symmetrical main frontage of five bays facing Church Square; the central section featured a tetrastyle portico with Doric order columns supporting an entablature and a pediment with a coat of arms in the tympanum.

The building was originally used as a facility for dispensing justice but, following the implementation of the Local Government (Ireland) Act 1898, which established county councils in every county, it also became the meeting place for Monaghan County Council. Monaghan County Museum was established in the courthouse in 1974. After a major fire in the courthouse in May 1981, the museum moved to Hill Street and the county council moved to the County Offices in Glen Road. A memorial to the victims of the 1974 Monaghan bombing was unveiled outside the courthouse by President Mary McAleese in 2004 and the courthouse was extensively refurbished in 2011.
