= County Offices =

County Offices may refer to:

- County Offices, Kendal, England
- County Offices, Lincoln, England
- County Offices, Monaghan, Ireland
- County Offices, Wick, Scotland
