= Monaghan County Museum =

- Músaem Chontae Mhuineacháin
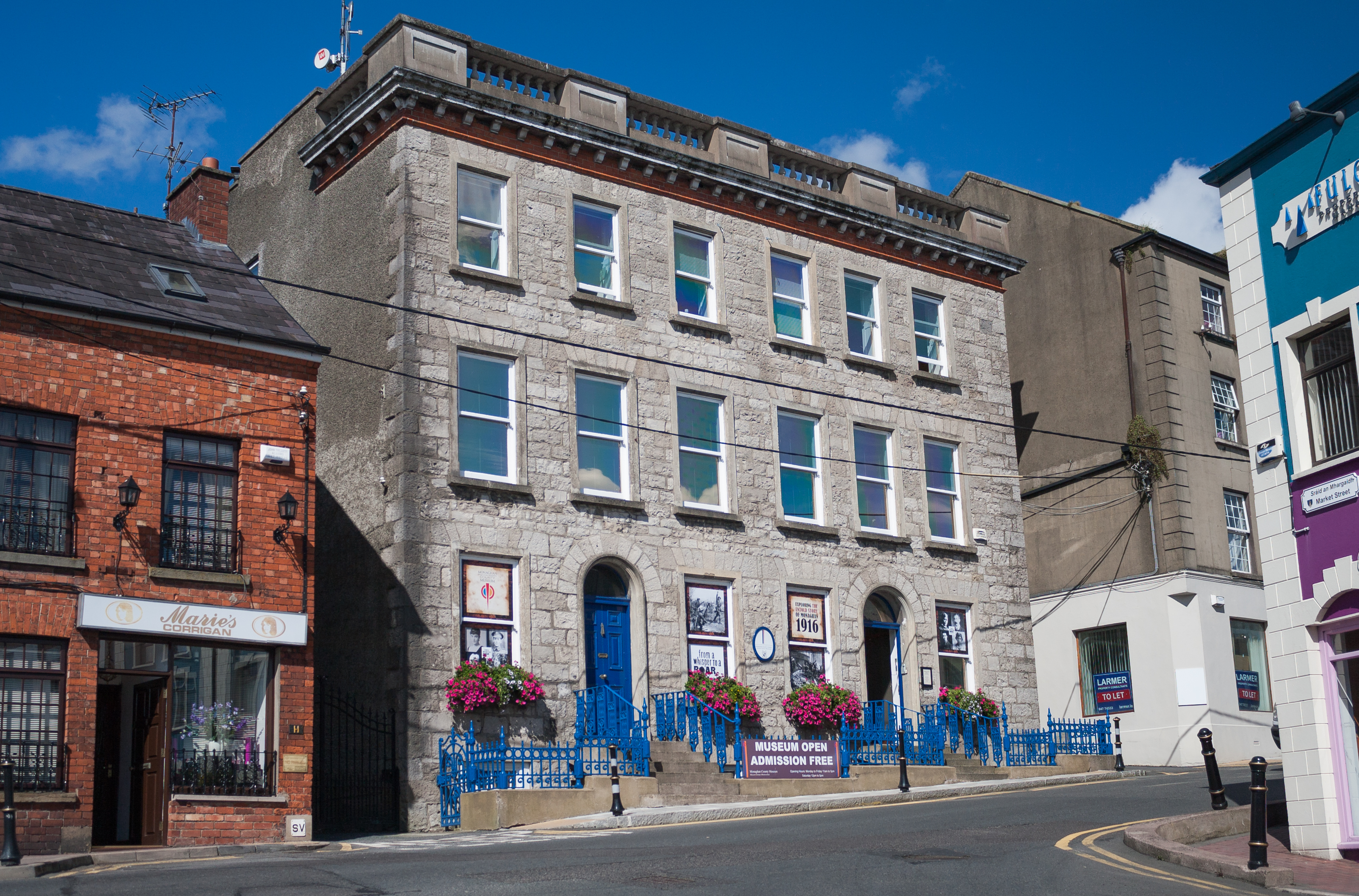

- Location within Ireland
- Established: 1974
- Location: 1-2 Hill Street, Monaghan, Ireland
- Coordinates: 54°14′52″N 6°58′21″W
- Type: County museum
- Curator: Liam Bradley
- Website: www.monaghan.ie/en/services/museum/

Monaghan County Museum (Irish: Músaem Chontae Mhuineacháin) is a museum which documents the history of County Monaghan.

== History ==
First opened in 1974, it was the first full-time, professionally staffed, and local authority funded Irish local museum. The museum was housed in Monaghan Courthouse in the centre of Monaghan town until a fire in 1981, which gutted the building. After rescuing the collections, the museum was moved for a period to St Macartan's College. In 1990 the museum reopened in the current premises of 1-2 Hill Street, which were originally two town houses dating from the 1860s, that were converted for the museum's use. The museum has won a number of awards over the years, including Council of Europe Museum Prize in 1980, and the Gulbenkian - Norwich Union Award for Best Collections Care in 1993.

== Contents ==
The collections of the museum document the history of County Monaghan over the course of human history. The museum also maintains a large collection of archival material, which include early estate records (rentals, maps and wages books) and local authority records. There are a number of notable archaeological objects in the museum, an example being the Lisdrumturk Cauldron, which was discovered in a bog in the county.

Due to the museum's accreditation from the Heritage Council, Museum Standards Programme for Ireland (MSPI), it is viewed as one of the most professionally run museums in Ireland. The museum is designated by the National Museum of Ireland to collect archaeological finds.
