= Brenda McAnespie =

Irish footballer, politician

Personal information
- Native name: Breannait Mhic an Easpaig (Irish)
- Born: February 1966 (age 60) Monaghan, Ireland
- Occupations: FÁS employee, county councillor

Sport
- Sport: Ladies' Football
- Position: back, goalkeeper
Clubs
- Years: Club
- Monaghan Harps; Emyvale
Inter-county
- Years: County
- 1991–2006: Monaghan
Inter-county titles
- All-Irelands: 2
- All Stars: 3

Brenda McAnespie

Monaghan County Councillor
- In office 11 June 1999 – 5 June 2009
- Constituency: Monaghan LEA

Personal details
- Party: Sinn Féin
- Spouse: Vincent McAnespie
- Children: 7, including Ryan McAnespie

Brenda McAnespie (born February 1966) is an Irish sportswoman. She played ladies' Gaelic football with her local club, Monaghan Harps, with Emyvale, and with the Monaghan county team.

== Early life ==
Brenda grew up in Scotstown, County Monaghan. She attended Urbleshanny National School and played Gaelic football on the boys' team at a time when ladies' Gaelic football was not widely played. At 13 or 14 this was no longer allowed and she switched to indoor soccer, playing as a goalkeeper.

She married Vincent McAnespie in 1989.

== Sporting career ==
In 1991 ladies' football began in Monaghan and McAnespie was involved from the beginning. They won the 1992 All-Ireland Junior Ladies' Football Championship, and went on to dominate the senior competition in the 1990s. McAnespie played in six All-Ireland senior finals, winning in 1996 and 1997. She won three All Stars, in 1996, 1997 and 1999.

McAnespie retired from county football in 2006.

In 2008, she was on an Emyvale team that won the All-Ireland Ladies Intermediate Club Football Championship, along with her daughters Ciara and Aoife.

McAnespie was named by the Irish Independent on a list of "The 10 greatest women GAA [sic] players of all time" in 2015. She was the subject of a 2020 Laochra Gael episode.

== Personal and political life ==
McAnespie has seven children, twins Aoife and Ciara, Shauna, Ryan, Eimear, Aisling and Darren. She also has six grandchildren, Caiden, Fionn, Zach, Mia, Caela and Iarlaith. Her son Ryan plays for Monaghan men's team.

She was elected to Monaghan County Council for Sinn Féin in 1999 and again in 2004.

Her husband, Vincent McAnespie, is also a longtime Sinn Féin activist. He was accused of involvement in the attempted murder of an Ulster Defence Regiment member in 1981; he was tried in 2010 and acquitted. His brother Aidan was killed by a British Army sniper in Aughnacloy, County Tyrone in 1988.
