= Ryan McAnespie =

Irish Gaelic footballer

Personal information
- Native name: Rían Mac an Easpaig (Irish)
- Born: Monaghan, Ireland
- Occupation: Teacher

Sport
- Sport: Gaelic football
- Position: Left half-forward
Club
- Years: Club
- Emyvale
Inter-county
- Years: County
- 2015-: Monaghan

Ryan McAnespie is a Gaelic football player from County Monaghan, Ireland. He plays at senior level for the Monaghan county team. In 2025 he was appointed Senior Football Vice-Captain alongside Rory Beggan.

== Personal life ==
McAnespie is the son of Brenda McAnespie (née Mohan), a former Monaghan county team ladies' Gaelic football player.

McAnespie's uncle Aidan was killed by a British Army sniper in Aughnacloy, County Tyrone in 1988.
