= Ellen McKenna =

Personal life
- Born: 24 December 1819 Traugh, Willville, County Monaghan
- Died: 2 August 1883 (aged 63) New York

Religious life
- Religion: Christian
- Order: Sisters of Mercy

Ellen McKenna or Sister Mary Augustine (24 December 1819 – 2 August 1883) was an Irish Sisters of Mercy nun, American civil war nurse and teacher.

== Early life and family ==
Ellen McKenna was born in Traugh, Willville, County Monaghan on 24 December 1819. She was the eldest of three daughters and two sons of James and Mary Anne McKenna. McKenna was educated at home, and then attended Miss Reynolds's private school in Dublin and a school local to her home. She taught poor children in Traugh to read and write from 1834, as well as preparing them for the sacraments. She emigrated to New York in 1849, arriving there on 2 April 1849 on the Emperor. She initially taught in a small private school in Schenectady. McKenna entered the Convent of Mercy, New York on 25 September 1855, receiving the habit of the Sisters of Mercy on 15 May 1856 and taking the name Sister Mary Augustine when she professed on 17 May 1858.

== Career ==
McKenna taught in convent school, teaching children and adults on Randall's Island on Saturdays. She also visited hospitals, The Tombs, and Sing Sing Prison. She was appointed sister in charge of a home for emigrant girls, the House of Mercy. McKenna opened a home for neglected young children on 21 November 1860. Any children not placed in homes or situations by age 16, would be transferred to the House of Mercy until a position was found for them. The house was closed while McKenna was away during the Civil War, she later reopened it. In these institutions she would have met a large number of Irish emigrants fleeing the Irish Famine.

Along with a number of fellow New York sisters, McKenna responded to the appeal for nurses for the Civil War. She took up her position as a military nurse in Beaufort, North Carolina on 19 July 1862. At first she was in charge of the kitchen, but then took up nursing duties, while also writing letters for the soldiers. She was appointed superior and superintendent on 19 September 1862 when her predecessor returned to New York. She fulfilled her promises made to dying soldiers on her return to New York, helping widows and orphan children, continuing her work for the next 20 years.

McKenna was made superior of the newly founded convent at Greenbush near Albany on 29 September 1863. She opened schools for infants, boys and girls in November of the same year. She was recalled to New York in September 1864, and was elected mistress of the novices on 10 October 1864. She served as superior of the convent from 28 May 1867 to 12 May 1877. In 1875 she established a convent as a rest house for NYC sister at Balmville in Newburgh, Orange county, and an industrial school for destitute and orphan children, being appointed superior of these institutions in 1877. She would raise funds when finances were strained by composing and publishing plays and poems.

She died 2 August 1883, and was buried in the community plot in Calvary Cemetery, New York.
