= Heather Humphreys =

Irish former politician (born 1960)

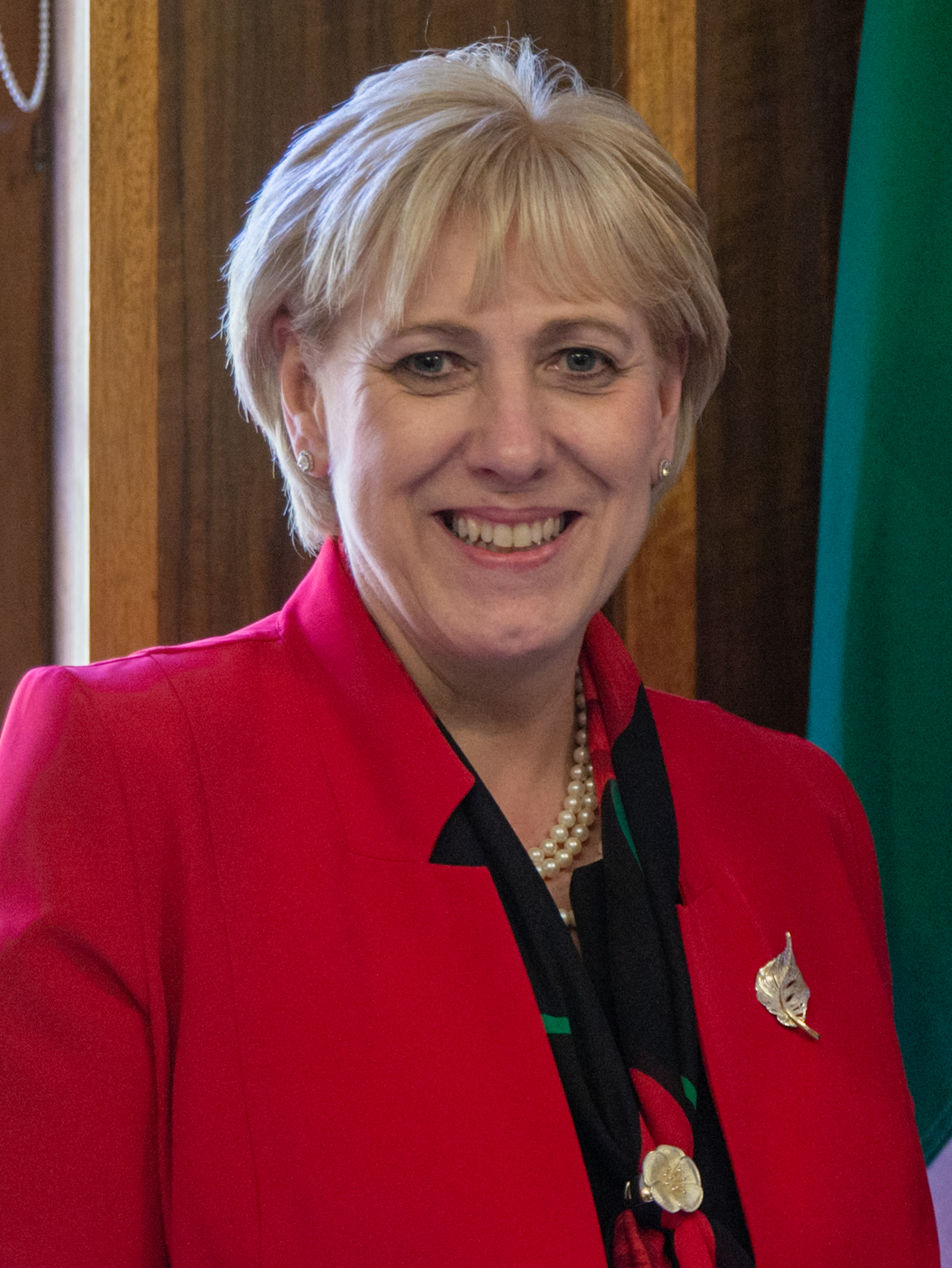
- Humphreys in 2019

Deputy leader of Fine Gael
- In office 5 April 2024 – 19 October 2024
- Leader: Simon Harris
- Preceded by: Simon Coveney
- Succeeded by: Helen McEntee
Ministerial positions
Minister for Social Protection
In office 27 June 2020 – 23 January 2025
| Taoiseach | Micheál Martin; Leo Varadkar; Simon Harris |
| Preceded by | Regina Doherty |
| Succeeded by | Dara Calleary |
Minister for Rural and Community Development
In office 27 June 2020 – 23 January 2025
| Taoiseach | Micheál Martin; Leo Varadkar; Simon Harris |
| Preceded by | Michael Ring |
| Succeeded by | Dara Calleary |
Minister for Justice
In office 26 November 2022 – 17 December 2022
| Taoiseach | Micheál Martin |
| Preceded by | Helen McEntee |
| Succeeded by | Simon Harris |
In office 27 April 2021 – 1 November 2021
| Taoiseach | Micheál Martin |
| Preceded by | Helen McEntee |
| Succeeded by | Helen McEntee |
Minister for Business, Enterprise and Innovation
In office 30 November 2017 – 27 June 2020
| Taoiseach | Leo Varadkar |
| Preceded by | Frances Fitzgerald |
| Succeeded by | Leo Varadkar (Enterprise, Trade and Employment) |
Minister for Culture, Heritage and the Gaeltacht
In office 14 June 2017 – 30 November 2017
| Taoiseach | Leo Varadkar |
| Preceded by | Herself (under old title) |
| Succeeded by | Josepha Madigan |
Minister for Arts, Heritage, Regional, Rural and Gaeltacht Affairs
In office 6 May 2016 – 14 June 2017
| Taoiseach | Enda Kenny |
| Preceded by | Herself (under old title) |
| Succeeded by | Herself (with new title) |
Minister for Arts, Heritage and the Gaeltacht
In office 11 July 2014 – 6 May 2016
| Taoiseach | Enda Kenny |
| Preceded by | Jimmy Deenihan |
| Succeeded by | Herself (with new title) |

Teachta Dála
- In office February 2011 – November 2024
- Constituency: Cavan–Monaghan

Monaghan County Councillor
- In office 2003–2011
- Constituency: Clones

Personal details
- Born: Heather Maud Stewart; 1960 (age 65–66) Drum, County Monaghan, Ireland
- Party: Fine Gael
- Spouse: Eric Humphreys (m. 1987)
- Children: 2
- Education: St. Aidan's Comprehensive School

Heather Maud Humphreys (née Stewart; born 1960) is an Irish former Fine Gael politician and credit union manager. A TD for Cavan–Monaghan from 2011 to 2024, she held multiple cabinet positions from July 2014 to January 2025 and was deputy leader of Fine Gael from April to October 2024.

Humphreys began her political career serving on Monaghan County Council from 2003 to 2011. First elected to Dáil Éireann at the 2011 general election, she was first appointed to cabinet in July 2014 as Minister for Arts, Heritage and the Gaeltacht. She later served as Minister for Business, Enterprise and Innovation from 2017 to 2020, as Minister for Social Protection and Minister for Rural and Community Development from 2000 to 2025, and temporarily as Minister for Justice in 2022 while her colleague Helen McEntee took maternity leave. In October 2024, she announced her decision to retire from politics, and did not contest the 2024 general election.

After Mairead McGuinness withdrew from the 2025 Irish presidential election, Fine Gael nominated Humphreys as its candidate. She received 29.5 percent of the vote and conceded the election to Catherine Connolly, who received 63.4 percent.

== Life and family ==
Heather Maud Stewart was born in the village of Drum, County Monaghan, in 1960. She grew up on a farm with her paternal grandparents, her parents, and her two younger brothers. She is a Presbyterian; her father was a member of the Orange Order, while her grandfather, Robert James Stewart, signed the Ulster Covenant opposing Home Rule in 1912. She has recalled being taken to Orange Order parades as a child, but stated that she stopped attending when the Troubles broke out. She also recalled being impacted by the death of Billy Fox, a Protestant Fine Gael politician from near Ballybay in County Monaghan, who was killed by the Provisional IRA in 1974.

Educated at St. Aidan's Comprehensive School in Cootehill, County Cavan, she began working for Ulster Bank in Dublin in 1978. In 1987, she married Eric Humphreys, a farmer from Dernaroy, near Newbliss, County Monaghan. Eric had also been a member of the Orange Order, although he ceased his involvement before they met. The couple have two daughters, Eva and Tara. In 1999, Humphreys became manager of Cootehill Credit Union, a position she held until 2011.

In 2015, her younger daughter Tara, then aged 19, was involved in a serious road accident after a car in which she was travelling swerved into a tree. Tara spent nine days in a coma but later recovered. Her older daughter Eva served on Monaghan County Council from 2017 to 2018 but resigned the position, citing the demands of her legal career. Humphreys has three grandchildren by Eva.

== Early political career ==
Following the abolition of the dual mandate in 2003, Humphreys was co-opted onto Monaghan County Council in succession to Seymour Crawford. She was elected in her own right at the 2004 local elections and once again following the 2009 local elections. She was elected as Mayor of Monaghan County in 2009. While a member of the council, she served as chair of the council's Strategic Policy Committee on Planning and Economic Development.

Humphreys was elected as a Fine Gael TD for Cavan–Monaghan at the 2011 general election. She was the only Presbyterian member of the Oireachtas during her tenure.

== Ministerial career ==
After an initial period on the backbenches, in a cabinet reshuffle in July 2014, Humphreys was appointed Minister for Arts, Heritage and the Gaeltacht. After just a few months in the position she became embroiled in controversy over her appointment of John McNulty to the board of the Irish Museum of Modern Art (IMMA) on 12 September 2014 just before his nomination for a Seanad by-election to the Cultural and Educational Panel. Fianna Fáil leader Micheál Martin said at the "very basic level, she should say what officials in Fine Gael asked her to appoint Mr McNulty to the board of Imma". Although Humphreys said John Nulty was selected "on merit", she later admitted she regretted the decision.

In the preparations of the 2016 Easter Rising centenary celebrations, she said:

Given my background as a Protestant and an Ulsterwoman who is a proud Irish republican, I appreciate the need to respect the differing traditions on this island.

In March 2016, Humphreys approved the redevelopment of some buildings on Moore Street on the basis that only numbers 14–17, which were where some of the leaders of the Easter Rising of 1916 met for the last time before their execution, had been designated a national monument. Her decision was later challenged but was ultimately upheld by the Court of Appeal.

Following the formation of a Fine Gael minority government in May 2016, she was appointed to the expanded position of Minister for Arts, Heritage, Regional, Rural and Gaeltacht Affairs. She was appointed as Minister for Culture, Heritage and the Gaeltacht in the government of Leo Varadkar in July 2017.

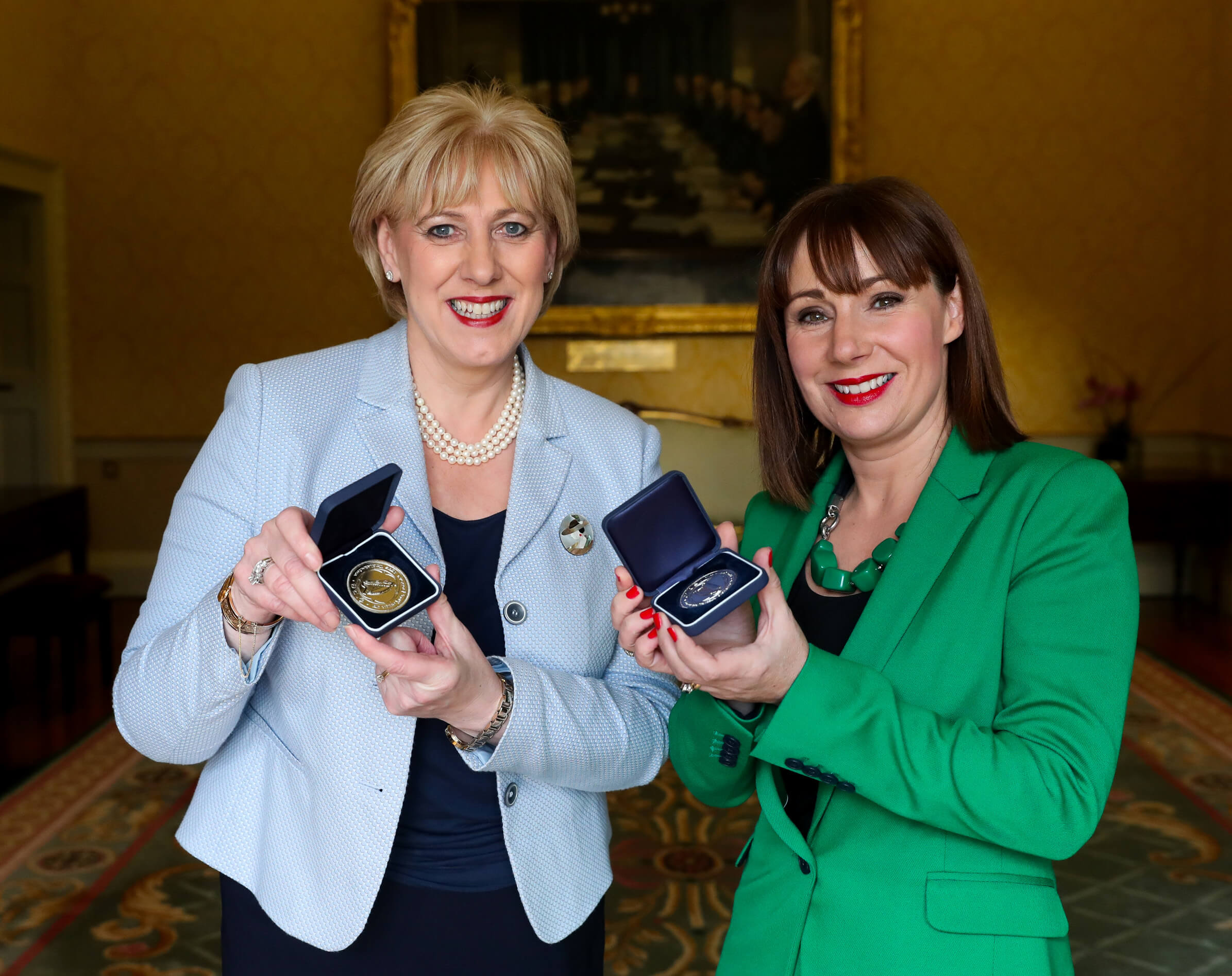
Humphreys in Áras an Uachtaráin alongside Josepha Madigan after being appointed as a government minister by President Michael D. Higgins

On 30 November 2017, she was appointed as Minister for Business, Enterprise and Innovation. She succeeded Frances Fitzgerald, who had resigned on 28 November.

On 27 June 2020, she was appointed as Minister for Social Protection and Minister for Rural and Community Development in the government led by Taoiseach Micheál Martin. On 27 April 2021, she was assigned the addition position of Minister for Justice on a temporary basis during the maternity leave of Helen McEntee, serving until 1 November 2021. In November 2022, she was assigned to the position of Minister for Justice for a second time on the maternity leave of McEntee.

On 17 December 2022, she was re-appointed to the same positions following Leo Varadkar's appointment as Taoiseach, but the temporary position of Minister for Justice was assigned to Simon Harris.

On 4 April 2023, The Ditch website reported that Humphreys had told two of their journalists to "fuck off" when they had questioned her on the use for storage of two derelict residential properties that she owns and are situated above her constituency office, without the required planning permission for change of use.

On 27 January 2024, she was appointed as Fine Gael's Director of Elections for the referendums on the Family and Care.

On 5 April 2024, she was appointed as Deputy leader of Fine Gael.

On 19 October 2024, Humphreys announced that she would not contest the 2024 general election, saying: "I'll be 65 next year and if I ran again I'd be nearly 70 by the end of the next Dáil term and I'm just not physically able to keep going for that long." She also stepped down as Fine Gael deputy leader.

== 2025 presidential campaign ==
2025 Heather Humphreys presidential campaign
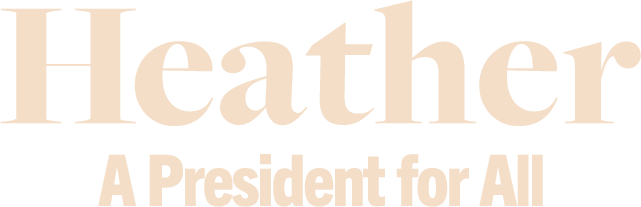
- Campaign: President of Ireland in the 2025 Irish presidential election
- Candidate: Heather Humphreys, Minister for Social Protection, Rural and Community Development (2020–2025)
- Affiliation: Fine Gael
- Status: Announcement: 19 August 2025; Nominated by Fine Gael: 2 September 2025; Campaign launch: 13 September 2025; Election lost: 25 October 2025
- Slogan: A President for All

Website
- heatherforpresident.ie

Humphreys initially ruled herself out when Fine Gael opened nominations for selection as the party candidate for the 2025 Irish presidential election. However, after Mairead McGuinness withdrew, Humphreys announced that she would seek the Fine Gael nomination for the presidency on 19 August 2025. On 2 September, Fine Gael confirmed Humphreys as the party's nominee for the presidential election. Those who endorsed her campaign included former Tánaistí Frances FitzGerald, Mary Coughlan and Mary Harney.

On 13 September 2025, Humphreys launched her national campaign at an event at the Peace Campus in her home county of Monaghan. She believed the venue reflected her vision for the presidency, including building bridges and bringing people together. Running on the slogan of "a president for all", her presidential campaign focused on reconciliation between the Irish nationalist community of the Irish republic and the Ulster unionist community of Northern Ireland, with inclusivity, unity and community forming the main elements of her campaign. She used her background as a Presbyterian from a unionist family in one of the three counties of Ulster outside Northern Ireland and her own Irish nationalism to pitch herself as a cross-community candidate who understands the needs of both communities. She campaigned on improving community links between the republic and Northern Ireland and also pledged her support for a united Ireland.

Humphreys received 29.5% of the votes in the election, coming second to Catherine Connolly, who received 63.4%.

== Electoral results ==
Elections to Monaghan County Council
| Party | Election | | FPv | FPv% | Result |
|---|---|---|---|---|---|
| Fine Gael | Clones LEA | 2004 | 1,091 | 18.1 | Elected on count 4/4 |
| Fine Gael | Clones LEA | 2009 | 1,554 | 23.9 | Elected on count 1/4 |

Elections to the Dáil
| Party | Election | | FPv | FPv% | Result |
|---|---|---|---|---|---|
| Fine Gael | Cavan–Monaghan | 2011 | 8,144 | 11.4 | Elected on count 9/9 |
| Fine Gael | Cavan–Monaghan | 2016 | 12,391 | 20.8 | Elected on count 1/10 |
| Fine Gael | Cavan–Monaghan | 2020 | 12,808 | 17.7 | Elected on count 1/11 |

Political offices
| Preceded by Jimmy Deenihan | Minister for Arts, Heritage and the Gaeltacht; 2014–2016 | Succeeded by Herself as Minister for Arts, Heritage, Regional, Rural and Gaeltacht Affairs |
| Preceded by Herself as Minister for Minister for Arts, Heritage and the Gaeltacht | Minister for Arts, Heritage, Regional, Rural and Gaeltacht Affairs; 2016–2017 | Succeeded by Herself as Minister for Culture, Heritage and the Gaeltacht |
| Preceded by Herself as Minister for Arts, Heritage, Regional, Rural and Gaeltacht Affairs | Minister for Culture, Heritage and the Gaeltacht; Jul.–Nov. 2017 | Succeeded by Josepha Madigan |
| Preceded by Frances Fitzgerald | Minister for Business, Enterprise and Innovation; 2017–2020 | Succeeded by Leo Varadkar as Minister for Enterprise, Trade and Employment |
| Preceded by Regina Doherty as Minister for Employment Affairs and Social Protection | Minister for Social Protection; 2020–2025 | Succeeded by Dara Calleary |
| Preceded by Michael Ring | Minister for Rural and Community Development; 2020–2025 | Succeeded by Dara Calleary |
| Preceded by Helen McEntee | Minister for Justice; April–November 2021 | Succeeded by Helen McEntee |
| Preceded by Helen McEntee | Minister for Justice; November–December 2022 | Succeeded by Simon Harris |
Party political offices
| Preceded by Simon Coveney | Deputy leader of Fine Gael; Apr.–Oct. 2024 | Succeeded by Helen McEntee |

| Dáil | Election | Deputy (Party) | Deputy (Party) | Deputy (Party) | Deputy (Party) | Deputy (Party) |
|---|---|---|---|---|---|---|
| 21st | 1977 | Jimmy Leonard (FF) | John Wilson (FF) | Thomas J. Fitzpatrick (FG) | Rory O'Hanlon (FF) | John Conlan (FG) |
| 22nd | 1981 | Kieran Doherty (AHB) | John Wilson (FF) | Thomas J. Fitzpatrick (FG) | Rory O'Hanlon (FF) | John Conlan (FG) |
| 23rd | 1982 (Feb) | Jimmy Leonard (FF) | John Wilson (FF) | Thomas J. Fitzpatrick (FG) | Rory O'Hanlon (FF) | John Conlan (FG) |
| 24th | 1982 (Nov) | Jimmy Leonard (FF) | John Wilson (FF) | Thomas J. Fitzpatrick (FG) | Rory O'Hanlon (FF) | John Conlan (FG) |
| 25th | 1987 | Jimmy Leonard (FF) | John Wilson (FF) | Thomas J. Fitzpatrick (FG) | Rory O'Hanlon (FF) | Andrew Boylan (FG) |
| 26th | 1989 | Jimmy Leonard (FF) | John Wilson (FF) | Bill Cotter (FG) | Rory O'Hanlon (FF) | Andrew Boylan (FG) |
| 27th | 1992 | Jimmy Leonard (FF) | Brendan Smith (FF) | Seymour Crawford (FG) | Rory O'Hanlon (FF) | Andrew Boylan (FG) |
| 28th | 1997 | Caoimhghín Ó Caoláin (SF) | Brendan Smith (FF) | Seymour Crawford (FG) | Rory O'Hanlon (FF) | Andrew Boylan (FG) |
| 29th | 2002 | Caoimhghín Ó Caoláin (SF) | Brendan Smith (FF) | Seymour Crawford (FG) | Rory O'Hanlon (FF) | Paudge Connolly (Ind.) |
| 30th | 2007 | Caoimhghín Ó Caoláin (SF) | Brendan Smith (FF) | Seymour Crawford (FG) | Rory O'Hanlon (FF) | Margaret Conlon (FF) |
| 31st | 2011 | Caoimhghín Ó Caoláin (SF) | Brendan Smith (FF) | Heather Humphreys (FG) | Joe O'Reilly (FG) | Seán Conlan (FG) |
| 32nd | 2016 | Caoimhghín Ó Caoláin (SF) | Brendan Smith (FF) | Heather Humphreys (FG) | Niamh Smyth (FF) | 4 seats 2016–2020 |
| 33rd | 2020 | Matt Carthy (SF) | Brendan Smith (FF) | Heather Humphreys (FG) | Niamh Smyth (FF) | Pauline Tully (SF) |
| 34th | 2024 | Matt Carthy (SF) | Brendan Smith (FF) | David Maxwell (FG) | Niamh Smyth (FF) | Cathy Bennett (SF) |
