= County Offices, Monaghan =

Municipal building in County Monaghan, Ireland

Coordinates: 54.2424°N 6.9714°W

The County Offices (Irish: Oifigí an Chontae, Muineachán) is a municipal facility at Monaghan, County Monaghan, Ireland.

== History ==
Originally Monaghan Courthouse had been the meeting place of Monaghan County Council. The site selected for the Council Offices, known as the Glen, had, in the early 18th century, been inhabited by Parra Glass, an outlaw and grandson of Patrick O'Connolly of Drumsnat, whose estate had been confiscated by Oliver Cromwell. The county council moved to the Glen, following a major fire in the courthouse, in 1981.
