= Robbie Gallagher =

Irish politician (born 1968)

Senator Robbie Gallagher
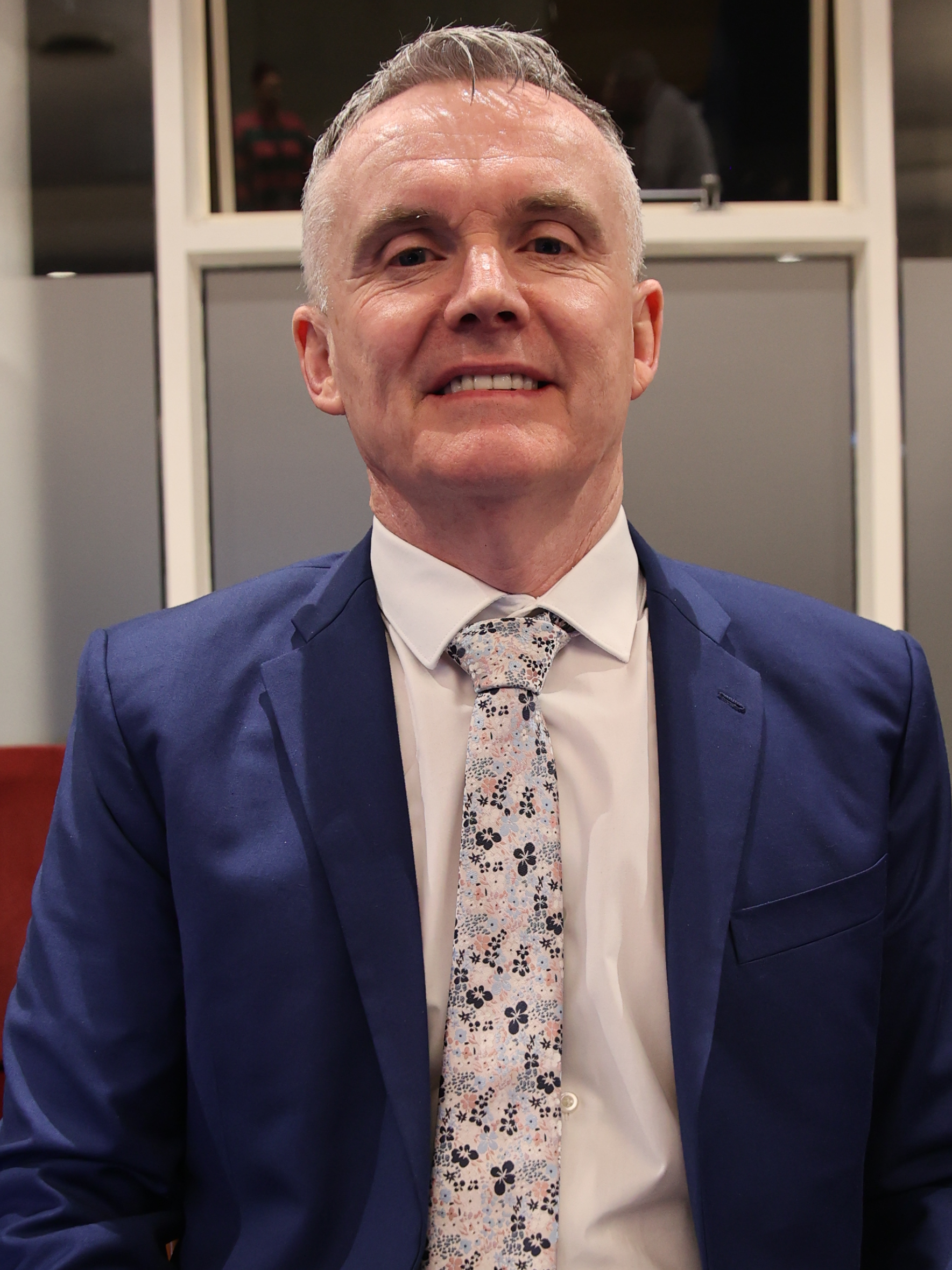
- Gallagher in 2025

Senator
- Incumbent
- Assumed office 8 June 2016
- Constituency: Labour Panel

Personal details
- Born: 19 February 1968 (age 58) Termon, County Donegal, Ireland
- Party: Fianna Fáil
- Spouse: Karen Gallagher (m. 1998)
- Children: 2
- Education: Garda Síochána College; Cork Institute of Technology

Robert Michael Gallagher (born 19 February 1968) is an Irish Fianna Fáil politician who has served as a senator for the Labour Panel since April 2016.

A former Garda and estate agent, he is from Termon and was a member of Monaghan County Council from 2004 to 2016. He also served on the now abolished Monaghan Town Council from 2004 to 2014.

He is the Fianna Fáil Seanad spokesperson on Justice. He was an unsuccessful candidate for Cavan–Monaghan at the 2002, 2020 and 2024 general elections. He was re-elected to the Seanad in 2020 and 2025.
