= Aidan McAnespie =

Irish man shot by British soldier

- Born: June 22, 1964; Aughnacloy, County Tyrone, Northern Ireland
- Died: February 21, 1988 (aged 23); Aughnacloy, County Tyrone, Northern Ireland
- Cause of death: Gunshot wound
- Known for: Being killed by a British Soldier at a border checkpoint
- Relatives: Vincent McAnespie (brother), Brenda McAnespie (sister-in-law), Ryan McAnespie (nephew)

Aidan McAnespie (22 June 1964 – 21 February 1988) was an Irish Catholic man who was shot in the back by a serving soldier after passing through the Aughnacloy, County Tyrone border checkpoint in Northern Ireland during the Troubles. In November 2022 former British soldier David Holden was found guilty of manslaughter.

== Biography ==
McAnespie was born into a Catholic family in Aughnacloy, County Tyrone, Northern Ireland, a small town with a Catholic majority. He was raised by his grandmother from the age of 3; she died a month before him. He was a member of Aghaloo O'Neills Gaelic football club. Many young Catholics in town reportedly were encouraged to move to America, Australia or other parts of the United Kingdom because of harassment from Unionists. "They say things like 'Got any bombs today?'" reported one of McAnespie's teammates, Seamus Singleton, shortly after his death. A Catholic priest, Rev. Joe McVeigh, stated that sons from large families were especially targeted for harassment in the hope they would encourage their families to leave.

At age 16, McAnespie finished school and got a job across the border at a poultry plant in Monaghan, Republic of Ireland. He eventually became a foreman, despite the daily border crossings over the River Blackwater that reportedly involved intensive searches. The harassment against McAnespie reportedly intensified after his sister Eilish McAnespie McCabe decided to run for the Tyrone County Council as a Sinn Féin candidate. McAnespie was an election worker for Sinn Féin, but both the Provisional Irish Republican Army and his priest said that he was not involved in any paramilitary activity.

== Death ==
McAnespie was travelling to a match when he was killed by a gunshot wound to the back. He had just walked past a British Army checkpoint. The British Army said that McAnespie had been hit when the weapon had discharged accidentally as a soldier was moving the gun with wet hands. Forensic evidence suggested that the fatal shot was one of three that had ricocheted off the road two metres behind McAnespie.

Charges were initially brought against Grenadier Guard David Jonathan Holden for manslaughter but were dropped prior to prosecution. He was fined for negligent discharge of the weapon and in 1990 was given a medical discharge.

McAnespie had previously said that he had been threatened by the security forces, and, according to his sister, soldiers had threatened to kill him on several occasions.

McAnespie's family allege a cover-up by the British government and question the likelihood of accidental discharge killing their son from a distance of 300 metres. His father, in an article in the Observer Magazine, said that a soldier had stopped him some fifteen months before the shooting and told him, "I've a bullet here in the gun for your son Aidan".

The Aughnacloy checkpoint became the target of a number of IRA attacks after the killing of McAnespie. Two of them took place in 1994, only a few months before the Provisional IRA ceasefire; the first when the outpost was hit by an unexploded heavy mortar bomb launched from a tractor on 9 April, and the second on 27 May, when a van armed with a heavy machine gun sprayed the compound with automatic fire. It was abandoned by the British Army in 1998, just after the Good Friday Agreement and its uncrewed facilities were demolished in 2008.

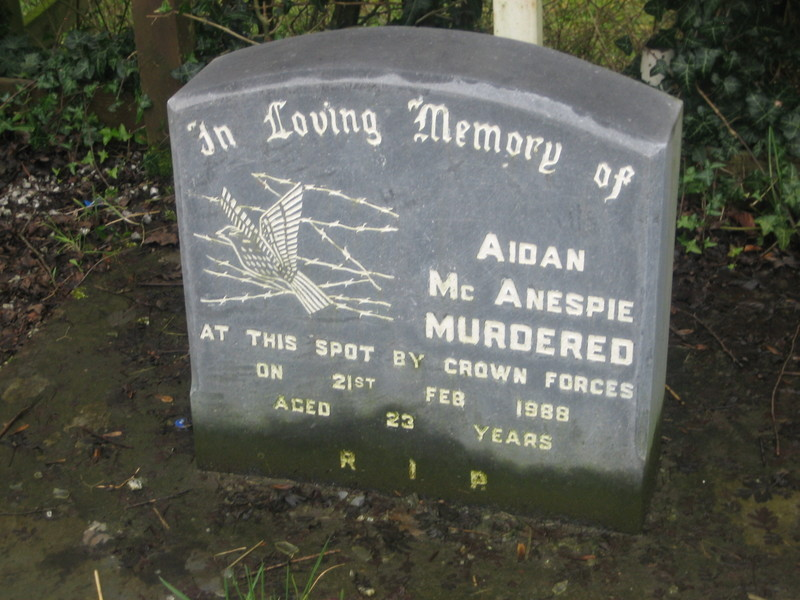
Tablet erected at spot where McAnespie was killed.

== Investigations ==
The day after the killing, the Irish Government appointed Garda Deputy Commissioner Eugene Crowley to investigate the incident. The results of the investigation were received by the Minister for Justice, Equality and Law Reform Gerry Collins on 8 April 1988, but have never been published. A Royal Ulster Constabulary investigation took place which concluded that the killing was accidental.

In June 2008, the Police Service of Northern Ireland (PSNI) Historical Enquiries Team published its findings on the case. The report called the soldier's explanation for the killing the "least likely version" of what happened.

In October 2008, the PSNI investigation concluded that David Holden's gun required 9 lbs (40 N) of force to pull the trigger, and that the soldier's account of the events was highly unlikely. It described the chances of this occurring, combined with hitting McAnespie by accident as, "so remote as to be virtually disregarded".

The Secretary of State for Northern Ireland, Shaun Woodward expressed "deep regret" at the incident in a statement made in July 2009, which was welcomed by McAnespie's family.

In January 2016, it was announced that the Public Prosecution Service would review the decision not to proceed with manslaughter charges against the soldier.

In June 2018, it was announced that a soldier was to be charged with manslaughter by gross negligence over the 1988 killing.

In March 2022, David Jonathan Holden once again stood trial for manslaughter charges and on 25 November 2022 was found guilty. In February 2023 he was sentenced to three years at Belfast Crown Court but judge Mr Justice O’Hara suspended the term for three years.

== Tributes ==
A Gaelic football club in Boston, Massachusetts is named in McAnespie's memory.

Aghaloo O'Neills GAC Gaelic Athletic Association club hosted a weekend of Gaelic football and cultural events in 2013 to mark the 25th anniversary of his death.

Irish singer-songwriter Gerry Cunningham wrote a song in tribute of Aidan McAnespie.
