= Matt Carthy =

Irish politician (born 1977)

Matt Carthy TD
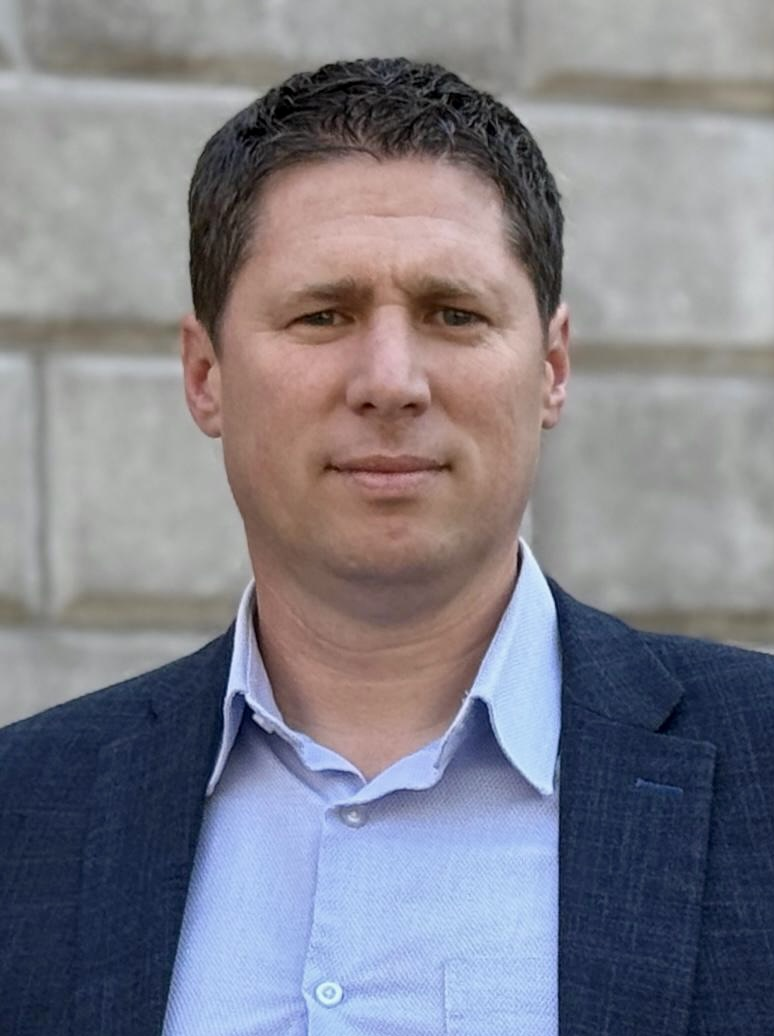
- Carthy in 2025

Teachta Dála
- Incumbent
- Assumed office February 2020
- Constituency: Cavan–Monaghan

Member of the European Parliament
- In office 1 July 2014 – 9 February 2020
- Constituency: Midlands–North-West

Personal details
- Born: Matthew Carthy; 19 July 1977 (age 49) Birmingham, England
- Party: Sinn Féin
- Spouse: Lynn Carthy (m. 2009)
- Children: 5
- Education: Dublin Institute of Technology
- Website: mattcarthy.ie

Matthew Carthy (born 19 July 1977) is an Irish Sinn Féin politician who has been a TD for the Cavan–Monaghan constituency since the 2020 general election. He previously served as a Member of the European Parliament (MEP) for the Midlands–North-West constituency from 2014 to 2020.

== Early and personal life ==
Carthy was born in Birmingham, England, in 1977. His mother is from County Monaghan and his father from County Roscommon. The family moved to County Roscommon when Carthy was aged two, where he lived until he was 10. His family then spent a year living in Holywell in north-east Wales before returning to Ireland to live in Carrickmacross, County Monaghan.

He has described the experience of living on the Irish border during the conflict as playing a formative role in shaping his republican political views, and cites hunger strikers Bobby Sands and Kieran Doherty as major influences.

Carthy studied marketing for a year at the Dublin Institute of Technology, where he formed a Sinn Féin college cumann (branch) in 1996. Carthy was a founding member of Ógra Shinn Féin (a Sinn Féin youth organisation) the following year. He worked as a full-time youth organiser for Ógra in Dublin in Sinn Féin's party headquarters, and as a press officer for Sinn Féin.

Carthy lives in Carrickmacross, County Monaghan, with wife Lynn and their five children.

== Political career ==
He was elected as the first Sinn Féin member of Carrickmacross Town Council in County Monaghan in 1999, becoming the youngest elected representative in the country (21 years old) at the time.

In June 2006, Carthy was elected as the first Sinn Féin Mayor of Carrickmacross Town Council. He was a member of Monaghan County Council from 2004 to 2014, and was elected mayor of Monaghan County Council in 2008.

At the 2014 European Parliament election, Carthy won 17.7% of first-preference votes. He took the third of four seats in the Midlands–North-West constituency. Former Provisional IRA member Thomas McMahon, who was convicted of the murder of Lord Louis Mountbatten and three others off the coast of Mullaghmore, County Sligo, in 1979, canvassed for Carthy in the elections.

In the European Parliament Carthy was a member of the Agriculture and Rural Affairs Committee (AGRI) and the Special Committee on Financial Crimes, Tax Evasion and Tax Avoidance (TAX3). He was a substitute member of the Economic and Monetary Affairs Committee (ECON) and Transport and Tourism Committee (TRAN). He was a full member of the Panama Papers Committee of Inquiry for its duration from 2016 to 2017.

In 2015, he was appointed as Sinn Féin's Uniting Ireland project coordinator. He was party whip in the European Parliament since 2014 and has been a member of the Ard Chomhairle (national executive) at regular intervals since 1998. He was the Sinn Féin Director of Elections for the 2016 general election.

On 26 April 2018, Carthy was selected to run as the Sinn Féin candidate for Cavan–Monaghan at the 2020 general election, following the announcement by sitting Sinn Féin TD Caoimhghín Ó Caoláin that he would not be contesting the next election. Carthy was elected on the first count. Sligo County Councillor Chris MacManus was nominated to fill Carthy's seat in the European Parliament following his election to the Dáil.

At the 2024 general election, Carthy was re-elected to the Dáil. He was subsequently appointed Cathaoirleach of the Committee on Justice, Home Affairs and Migration.

Dáil	Election	Deputy (Party)	Deputy (Party)	Deputy (Party)	Deputy (Party)	Deputy (Party)
21st	1977	Jimmy Leonard (FF)	John Wilson (FF)	Thomas J. Fitzpatrick (FG)	Rory O'Hanlon (FF)	John Conlan (FG)
22nd	1981	Kieran Doherty (AHB)	John Wilson (FF)	Thomas J. Fitzpatrick (FG)	Rory O'Hanlon (FF)	John Conlan (FG)
23rd	1982 (Feb)	Jimmy Leonard (FF)	John Wilson (FF)	Thomas J. Fitzpatrick (FG)	Rory O'Hanlon (FF)	John Conlan (FG)
24th	1982 (Nov)	Jimmy Leonard (FF)	John Wilson (FF)	Thomas J. Fitzpatrick (FG)	Rory O'Hanlon (FF)	John Conlan (FG)
25th	1987	Jimmy Leonard (FF)	John Wilson (FF)	Thomas J. Fitzpatrick (FG)	Rory O'Hanlon (FF)	Andrew Boylan (FG)
26th	1989	Jimmy Leonard (FF)	John Wilson (FF)	Bill Cotter (FG)	Rory O'Hanlon (FF)	Andrew Boylan (FG)
27th	1992	Jimmy Leonard (FF)	Brendan Smith (FF)	Seymour Crawford (FG)	Rory O'Hanlon (FF)	Andrew Boylan (FG)
28th	1997	Caoimhghín Ó Caoláin (SF)	Brendan Smith (FF)	Seymour Crawford (FG)	Rory O'Hanlon (FF)	Andrew Boylan (FG)
29th	2002	Caoimhghín Ó Caoláin (SF)	Brendan Smith (FF)	Seymour Crawford (FG)	Rory O'Hanlon (FF)	Paudge Connolly (Ind.)
30th	2007	Caoimhghín Ó Caoláin (SF)	Brendan Smith (FF)	Seymour Crawford (FG)	Rory O'Hanlon (FF)	Margaret Conlon (FF)
31st	2011	Caoimhghín Ó Caoláin (SF)	Brendan Smith (FF)	Heather Humphreys (FG)	Joe O'Reilly (FG)	Seán Conlan (FG)
32nd	2016	Caoimhghín Ó Caoláin (SF)	Brendan Smith (FF)	Heather Humphreys (FG)	Niamh Smyth (FF)	4 seats 2016–2020
33rd	2020	Matt Carthy (SF)	Brendan Smith (FF)	Heather Humphreys (FG)	Niamh Smyth (FF)	Pauline Tully (SF)
34th	2024	Matt Carthy (SF)	Brendan Smith (FF)	David Maxwell (FG)	Niamh Smyth (FF)	Cathy Bennett (SF)
