= Paudge Connolly =

Irish politician (born 1953)

Monaghan County Councillor
- In office May 2014 – June 2024
- Constituency: Monaghan Town

Teachta Dála
- In office May 2002 – May 2007
- Constituency: Cavan–Monaghan

Personal details
- Born: 23 September 1953 (age 72)
- Party: Independent
- Spouse: Winnie Connolly
- Children: 4
- Website: Official website

Patrick "Paudge" Connolly (born 23 September 1953) is a former independent politician from County Monaghan in Ireland. He was a TD for Cavan–Monaghan from 2002 to 2007.

A psychiatric nurse and part-time secretary of the Health Services Branch of the SIPTU trade union, Connolly was elected to Dáil Éireann at the 2002 general election as an independent TD, campaigning primarily around the defence of services of Monaghan Hospital. He joined with other independent TDs to form a Technical group in order to gain speaking rights in the Dáil. He lost his seat at the 2007 general election. After his defeat he stood for election to Seanad Éireann on the Labour Panel, but was not elected. He was elected to Monaghan County Council at the 2009 local elections and was re-elected in both 2014 and 2019. He lost his seat at the 2024 local elections.

In August 2020, Connolly was one of 81 people who attended a dinner in Clifden, County Galway organised by the Oireachtas Golf Society. The gathering took place contrary to public health advice that had been issued in response to the COVID-19 pandemic in the Republic of Ireland, and became a major political scandal. Additionally, Connolly had played golf in Cabo Roig, Spain, on 11 August, so he would have been at most eight days into the 14-day quarantine period which the Irish government required from people travelling from Spain.

Dáil	Election	Deputy (Party)	Deputy (Party)	Deputy (Party)	Deputy (Party)	Deputy (Party)
21st	1977	Jimmy Leonard (FF)	John Wilson (FF)	Thomas J. Fitzpatrick (FG)	Rory O'Hanlon (FF)	John Conlan (FG)
22nd	1981	Kieran Doherty (AHB)	John Wilson (FF)	Thomas J. Fitzpatrick (FG)	Rory O'Hanlon (FF)	John Conlan (FG)
23rd	1982 (Feb)	Jimmy Leonard (FF)	John Wilson (FF)	Thomas J. Fitzpatrick (FG)	Rory O'Hanlon (FF)	John Conlan (FG)
24th	1982 (Nov)	Jimmy Leonard (FF)	John Wilson (FF)	Thomas J. Fitzpatrick (FG)	Rory O'Hanlon (FF)	John Conlan (FG)
25th	1987	Jimmy Leonard (FF)	John Wilson (FF)	Thomas J. Fitzpatrick (FG)	Rory O'Hanlon (FF)	Andrew Boylan (FG)
26th	1989	Jimmy Leonard (FF)	John Wilson (FF)	Bill Cotter (FG)	Rory O'Hanlon (FF)	Andrew Boylan (FG)
27th	1992	Jimmy Leonard (FF)	Brendan Smith (FF)	Seymour Crawford (FG)	Rory O'Hanlon (FF)	Andrew Boylan (FG)
28th	1997	Caoimhghín Ó Caoláin (SF)	Brendan Smith (FF)	Seymour Crawford (FG)	Rory O'Hanlon (FF)	Andrew Boylan (FG)
29th	2002	Caoimhghín Ó Caoláin (SF)	Brendan Smith (FF)	Seymour Crawford (FG)	Rory O'Hanlon (FF)	Paudge Connolly (Ind.)
30th	2007	Caoimhghín Ó Caoláin (SF)	Brendan Smith (FF)	Seymour Crawford (FG)	Rory O'Hanlon (FF)	Margaret Conlon (FF)
31st	2011	Caoimhghín Ó Caoláin (SF)	Brendan Smith (FF)	Heather Humphreys (FG)	Joe O'Reilly (FG)	Seán Conlan (FG)
32nd	2016	Caoimhghín Ó Caoláin (SF)	Brendan Smith (FF)	Heather Humphreys (FG)	Niamh Smyth (FF)	4 seats 2016–2020
33rd	2020	Matt Carthy (SF)	Brendan Smith (FF)	Heather Humphreys (FG)	Niamh Smyth (FF)	Pauline Tully (SF)
34th	2024	Matt Carthy (SF)	Brendan Smith (FF)	David Maxwell (FG)	Niamh Smyth (FF)	Cathy Bennett (SF)
