= David Maxwell (Irish politician) =

Irish politician (born 1965)

David Maxwell TD
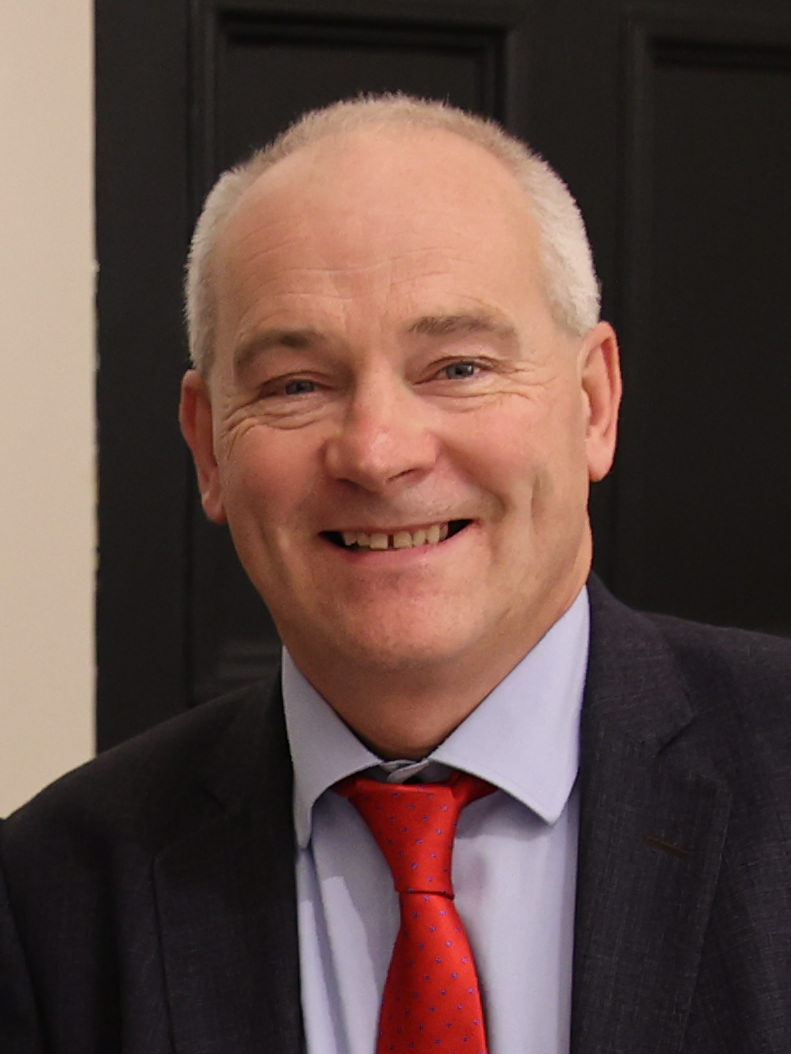
- Maxwell in 2024

Teachta Dála
- Incumbent
- Assumed office November 2024
- Constituency: Cavan–Monaghan

Personal details
- Born: October 1965 (age 60)
- Party: Fine Gael
- Children: 2

David Maxwell (born October 1965) is an Irish Fine Gael politician who has been a TD for Cavan–Monaghan since the 2024 general election.

== Political career ==
Maxwell was a member of Monaghan County Council from 2004 to 2024 for the Monaghan area.

At the 2024 general election, Maxwell was elected to the Dáil.

== Personal life ==
Maxwell is married with two children. He has worked as an undertaker, and grew up in County Antrim during the Troubles – attending Ballycraigy primary school – before returning to live in his father's home town of Monaghan. He describes himself as "coming from the Protestant background".

| Dáil | Election | Deputy (Party) | Deputy (Party) | Deputy (Party) | Deputy (Party) | Deputy (Party) |
|---|---|---|---|---|---|---|
| 21st | 1977 | Jimmy Leonard (FF) | John Wilson (FF) | Thomas J. Fitzpatrick (FG) | Rory O'Hanlon (FF) | John Conlan (FG) |
| 22nd | 1981 | Kieran Doherty (AHB) | John Wilson (FF) | Thomas J. Fitzpatrick (FG) | Rory O'Hanlon (FF) | John Conlan (FG) |
| 23rd | 1982 (Feb) | Jimmy Leonard (FF) | John Wilson (FF) | Thomas J. Fitzpatrick (FG) | Rory O'Hanlon (FF) | John Conlan (FG) |
| 24th | 1982 (Nov) | Jimmy Leonard (FF) | John Wilson (FF) | Thomas J. Fitzpatrick (FG) | Rory O'Hanlon (FF) | John Conlan (FG) |
| 25th | 1987 | Jimmy Leonard (FF) | John Wilson (FF) | Thomas J. Fitzpatrick (FG) | Rory O'Hanlon (FF) | Andrew Boylan (FG) |
| 26th | 1989 | Jimmy Leonard (FF) | John Wilson (FF) | Bill Cotter (FG) | Rory O'Hanlon (FF) | Andrew Boylan (FG) |
| 27th | 1992 | Jimmy Leonard (FF) | Brendan Smith (FF) | Seymour Crawford (FG) | Rory O'Hanlon (FF) | Andrew Boylan (FG) |
| 28th | 1997 | Caoimhghín Ó Caoláin (SF) | Brendan Smith (FF) | Seymour Crawford (FG) | Rory O'Hanlon (FF) | Andrew Boylan (FG) |
| 29th | 2002 | Caoimhghín Ó Caoláin (SF) | Brendan Smith (FF) | Seymour Crawford (FG) | Rory O'Hanlon (FF) | Paudge Connolly (Ind.) |
| 30th | 2007 | Caoimhghín Ó Caoláin (SF) | Brendan Smith (FF) | Seymour Crawford (FG) | Rory O'Hanlon (FF) | Margaret Conlon (FF) |
| 31st | 2011 | Caoimhghín Ó Caoláin (SF) | Brendan Smith (FF) | Heather Humphreys (FG) | Joe O'Reilly (FG) | Seán Conlan (FG) |
| 32nd | 2016 | Caoimhghín Ó Caoláin (SF) | Brendan Smith (FF) | Heather Humphreys (FG) | Niamh Smyth (FF) | 4 seats 2016–2020 |
| 33rd | 2020 | Matt Carthy (SF) | Brendan Smith (FF) | Heather Humphreys (FG) | Niamh Smyth (FF) | Pauline Tully (SF) |
| 34th | 2024 | Matt Carthy (SF) | Brendan Smith (FF) | David Maxwell (FG) | Niamh Smyth (FF) | Cathy Bennett (SF) |
