= Monaghan County Council =

Local authority of County Monaghan, Ireland

Monaghan County Council Comhairle Contae Mhuineacháin
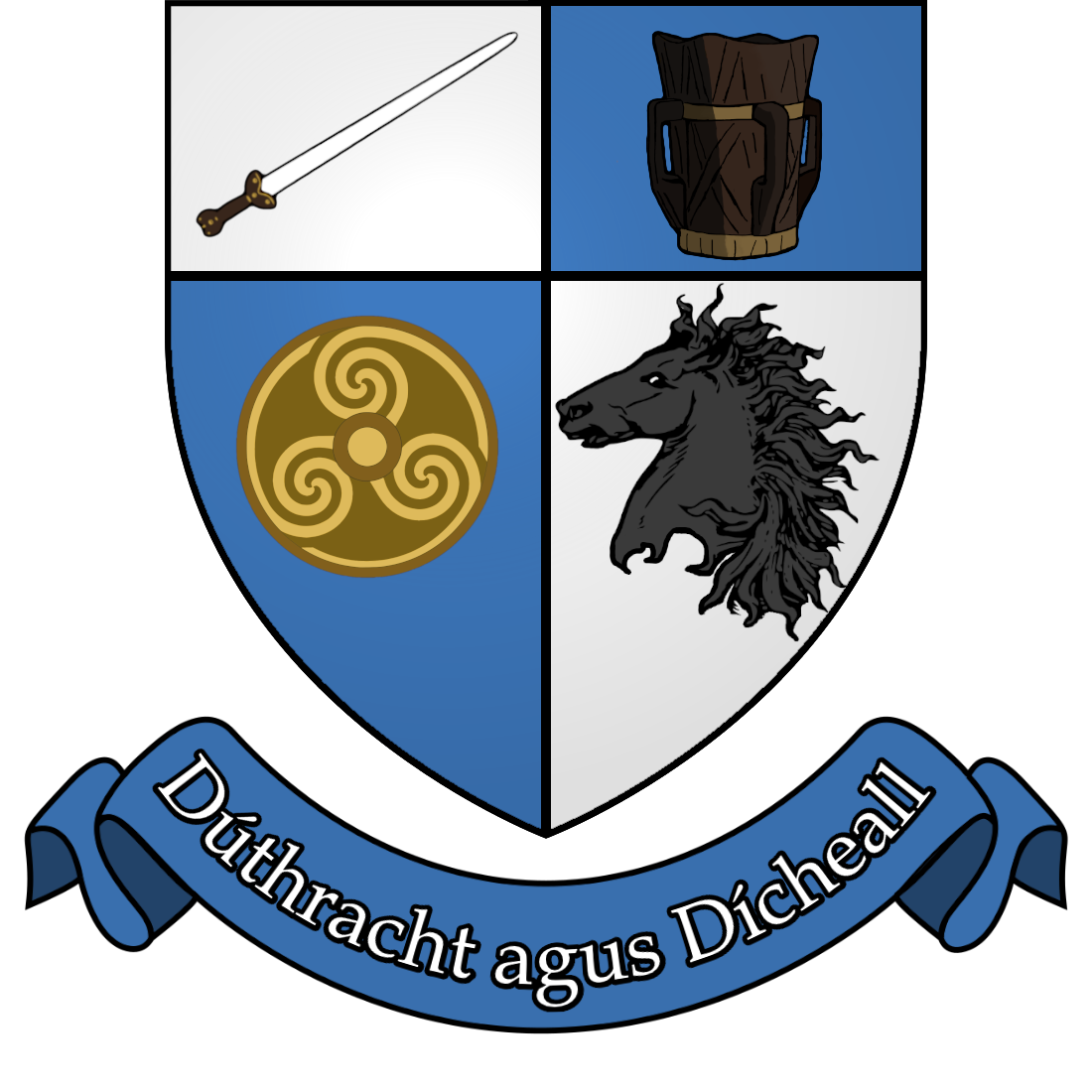

Type
- Type: County council of County Monaghan

History
- Founded: 1 April 1899

Leadership
- Cathaoirleach: Aidan Campbell, FG

Structure
- Seats: 18
- Political groups: Sinn Féin (8) Fine Gael (6) Fianna Fáil (3) Independent (1)

Elections
- Last election: 7 June 2024

Motto
- Irish: Dúthracht agus Dícheall "Diligence and Best Endeavour"

Meeting place
- County Offices, Monaghan

Website
- Official website

Monaghan County Council (Irish: Comhairle Contae Mhuineacháin) is the local authority of County Monaghan, Ireland. As a county council, it is governed by the Local Government Act 2001. The council is responsible for housing and community, roads and transportation, urban planning and development, amenity and culture, and environment. The council has 18 elected members. Elections are held every five years and are by single transferable vote. The head of the council has the title of Cathaoirleach (chairperson). The county administration is headed by a chief executive, Robert Burns. The county town is Monaghan.

== History ==
Monaghan County Council was established on 1 April 1899 under the Local Government (Ireland) Act 1898 for the administrative county of County Monaghan, succeeding the judicial county of Monaghan.

Originally Monaghan Courthouse had been the meeting place of Monaghan County Council. The county council moved to the County Offices in Glen Road in 1981.

== Regional Assembly ==
Monaghan County Council has two representatives on the Northern and Western Regional Assembly where they are part of the Border Strategic Planning Area Committee.

== Elections ==
The Local Government (Ireland) Act 1919 introduced the electoral system of proportional representation by means of the single transferable vote (PR-STV) for the 1920 Irish local elections. County Monaghan was divided into 4 county electoral areas to elect the 20 members of the council. This electoral system has been retained, with 18 members of Monaghan County Council now elected for a five-year term of office from 3 multi-member local electoral areas (LEAs).

Year	SF	FG	FF	MPA	CnaP	CnaT	IFF	NL	RA	UTA	Rep	SF (pre-1922)	U	IrishNat	Ind.	Total
2024	8	6	3	0	—N/a	—N/a	0	—N/a	—N/a	—N/a	—N/a	—N/a	0	—N/a	1	18
2019	6	5	4	0	—N/a	—N/a	0	—N/a	—N/a	—N/a	—N/a	—N/a	0	—N/a	3	18
2014	7	5	4	0	—N/a	—N/a	0	—N/a	—N/a	—N/a	—N/a	—N/a	0	—N/a	2	18
2009	7	6	5	0	—N/a	—N/a	0	—N/a	—N/a	—N/a	—N/a	—N/a	0	—N/a	2	20
2004	7	7	5	0	—N/a	—N/a	0	—N/a	—N/a	—N/a	—N/a	—N/a	0	—N/a	1	20
1999	6	6	8	0	—N/a	—N/a	0	—N/a	—N/a	—N/a	—N/a	—N/a	0	—N/a	0	20
1991	2	7	8	2	—N/a	—N/a	0	—N/a	—N/a	—N/a	—N/a	—N/a	0	—N/a	1	20
1985	2	7	10	1	—N/a	—N/a	0	—N/a	—N/a	—N/a	—N/a	—N/a	0	—N/a	0	20
1979	0	8	9	2	—N/a	—N/a	0	—N/a	—N/a	—N/a	—N/a	—N/a	0	—N/a	1	20
1974	1	8	7	2	—N/a	—N/a	0	—N/a	—N/a	—N/a	—N/a	—N/a	0	—N/a	2	20
1967	1	7	7	3	—N/a	—N/a	0	—N/a	—N/a	—N/a	—N/a	—N/a	0	—N/a	2	20
1960	2	5	8	1	0	0	0	—N/a	—N/a	—N/a	—N/a	—N/a	0	—N/a	4	20
1955	0	4	8	3	0	0	0	—N/a	—N/a	—N/a	—N/a	—N/a	0	—N/a	5	20
1950	0	0	7	3	2	0	0	—N/a	—N/a	—N/a	—N/a	—N/a	0	—N/a	8	20
1945	0	0	11	3	—N/a	2	0	—N/a	—N/a	—N/a	—N/a	—N/a	0	—N/a	4	20
1942	0	2	8	3	—N/a	5	0	—N/a	—N/a	—N/a	—N/a	—N/a	0	—N/a	2	20
1934	0	10	11	5	—N/a	—N/a	0	—N/a	—N/a	—N/a	—N/a	—N/a	0	—N/a	2 (Note: Includes 1 Independent Republican.)	28
1928	0	—N/a	5	6	—N/a	—N/a	2	3	—N/a	—N/a	—N/a	—N/a	0	—N/a	12	28
1925	—N/a	—N/a	—N/a	—N/a	—N/a	—N/a	—N/a	—N/a	5	5	3	—N/a	0	—N/a	15	28
1920	—N/a	—N/a	—N/a	—N/a	—N/a	—N/a	—N/a	—N/a	0	0	—N/a	16	4	0	0	20
1914	—N/a	—N/a	—N/a	—N/a	—N/a	—N/a	—N/a	—N/a			—N/a					20
1911	—N/a	—N/a	—N/a	—N/a	—N/a	—N/a	—N/a	—N/a			—N/a					20
1908	—N/a	—N/a	—N/a	—N/a	—N/a	—N/a	—N/a	—N/a			—N/a					20
1905	—N/a	—N/a	—N/a	—N/a	—N/a	—N/a	—N/a	—N/a			—N/a					20
1902	—N/a	—N/a	—N/a	—N/a	—N/a	—N/a	—N/a	—N/a			—N/a	—N/a				20
1899	—N/a	—N/a	—N/a	—N/a	—N/a	—N/a	—N/a	—N/a	0	0	—N/a	—N/a	2	18	0	20

== Local electoral areas and municipal districts ==
The area governed by the council

County Monaghan is divided into LEAs and municipal districts, defined by electoral divisions.

LEA and municipal district	Definition	Seats
Ballybay–Clones	Aghabog, Anny, Ballybay Rural, Ballybay Urban, Bellatrain, Caddagh, Carrickatee, Clones, Clones Rural, Clones Urban, Cormeen, Corracharra, Creeve, Cremartin, Currin, Dawsongrove, Drum, Drumhillagh, Drummully, Drumsnat, Greagh, Killeevan, Killynenagh, Kilmore, Laragh, Lisnaveane, Newbliss, Raferagh, St. Tierney and Tullycorbet	5
Carrickmacross–Castleblayney	Ballymackney, Bocks, Broomfield, Carrickaslane, Carrickmacross Rural, Carrickmacross Urban, Castleblayney Rural, Castleblayney Urban, Church Hill, Crossalare, Donaghmoyne, Drumboory, Drumcarrow, Drumgurra, Enagh (in the former Rural District of Carrickmacross), Inishkeen, Kilmurry, Kiltybegs, Lough Fea and Mullyash	6
Monaghan	Anketell Grove, Annayalla, Bellanode, Bragan, Castleshane, Clontibret, Derrygorry, Emyvale, Enagh (in the former Rural District of Monaghan), Figullar, Glaslough, Killylough, Monaghan Rural, Monaghan Urban, Rackwallace, Scotstown, Shanmullagh, Sheskin, Tydavnet and Tehallan	7

== Councillors ==
The following were elected at the 2024 Monaghan County Council election.

=== 2024 seats summary ===
Party	Seats
Sinn Féin	8
Fine Gael	6
Fianna Fáil	3
Independent	1

=== Councillors by electoral area ===
This list reflects the order in which councillors were elected on 7 June 2024.

Council members from 2024 election
Local electoral area	Name	Party
Ballybay–Clones	Seamus Coyle (Note: Replaced during term, see table below for details.)	Fianna Fáil
Ballybay–Clones	Richard Truell	Fine Gael
Ballybay–Clones	Seán Gilliland	Fine Gael
Ballybay–Clones	Sinéad Flynn	Sinn Féin
Ballybay–Clones	Pat Treanor	Sinn Féin
Carrickmacross–Castleblayney	P. J. O'Hanlon	Fianna Fáil
Carrickmacross–Castleblayney	Aidan Campbell	Fine Gael
Carrickmacross–Castleblayney	Colm Carthy	Sinn Féin
Carrickmacross–Castleblayney	Noel Keelan	Sinn Féin
Carrickmacross–Castleblayney	Peter Conlon	Fine Gael
Carrickmacross–Castleblayney	Paul Gibbons	Sinn Féin
Monaghan	Cathy Bennett	Sinn Féin
Monaghan	Raymond Aughey	Fianna Fáil
Monaghan	Seamus Treanor	Independent
Monaghan	Pauric Clerkin	Fine Gael
Monaghan	David Maxwell	Fine Gael
Monaghan	Seán Conlon	Sinn Féin
Monaghan	Bronagh McAree	Sinn Féin

==== Co-options ====
Party	Outgoing	LEA	Reason	Date	Co-optee
Fine Gael	David Maxwell	Monaghan	Elected to 34th Dáil at the 2024 general election	12 December 2024	Alan Johnston
Sinn Féin	Cathy Bennett	Monaghan	Elected to 34th Dáil at the 2024 general election	16 December 2024	Niamh McCooey
Fianna Fáil	Seamus Coyle	Ballybay–Clones	Death.	8 October 2026	Margaret Conlon
