= County Monaghan =

County in Ireland

Coordinates: 54.244°N 7.040°W

County Monaghan Contae Mhuineacháin
- County
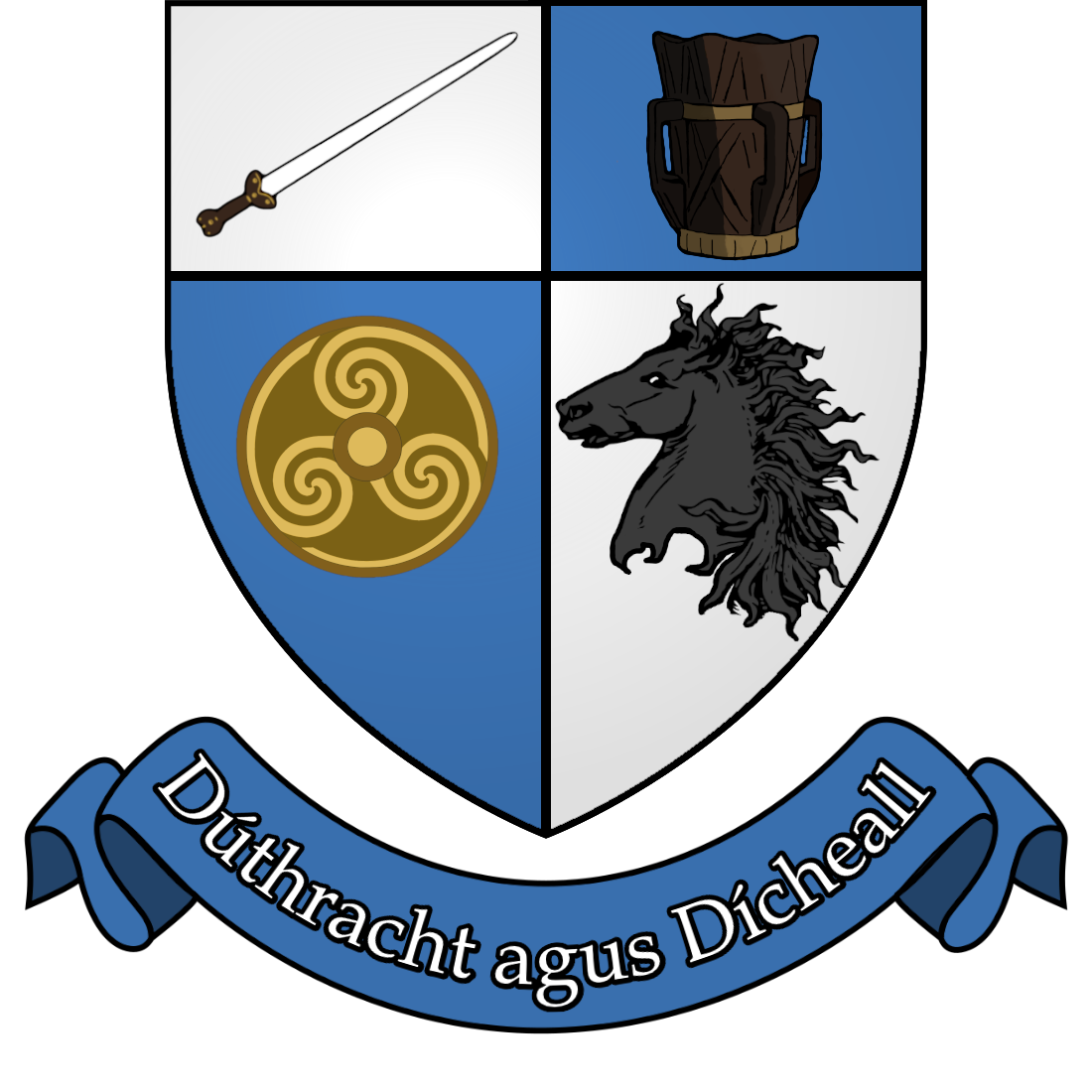
- Coat of arms
- Nicknames: The Drumlin County; The Farney County
- Motto: Dúthracht agus Dícheall (Irish) "Diligence and Best Endeavour"
- Interactive map of County Monaghan
- Country: Ireland
- Province: Ulster
- Region: Northern and Western
- Established: 1585
- County town: Monaghan

Government
  - Local authority: Monaghan County Council
  - Dáil constituency: Cavan–Monaghan
  - EP constituency: Midlands–North-West

Area
  - Total: 1,295 km^{2} (500 sq mi)
  - Rank: 28th
- Highest elevation (Slieve Beagh): 373 m (1,224 ft)

Population (2022)
  - Total: 65,288
  - Rank: 28th
  - Density: 50.42/km^{2} (130.6/sq mi)
- Time zone: UTC±0 (WET)
  - Summer (DST): UTC+1 (IST)
- Eircode routing keys: A75, A81, H18, H23
- Telephone area codes: in the South of the County 042 - Carrickmacross and Castleblayney in the North of the County 047 - Clones and Monaghan
- ISO 3166 code: IE-MN
- Vehicle index mark code: MN
- Website: Official website

County Monaghan (/ˈmɒnəhən/ MON-ə-hən; Irish: Contae Mhuineacháin) is a county in the Republic of Ireland. It is in the province of Ulster and is part of Border strategic planning area of the Northern and Western Region. It is named after the town of Monaghan. Monaghan County Council is the local authority for the county. The population of the county was 65,288, according to the 2022 census.

The county has existed since 1585 when the Mac Mathghamhna rulers of Airgíalla agreed to join the Kingdom of Ireland. Following the 20th-century Irish War of Independence and the signing of the Anglo-Irish Treaty, Monaghan was one of three Ulster counties to join the Irish Free State rather than Northern Ireland.

== Geography and subdivisions ==
County Monaghan is the fifth-smallest of the Republic's 26 counties by area, and the fourth smallest by population. It is the smallest of Ulster's nine counties in terms of population.

Historical population
Year	Pop.	±%
1600	2,988	—
1610	4,663	+56.1%
1653	5,801	+24.4%
1659	9,734	+67.8%
1821	174,697	+1694.7%
1831	195,536	+11.9%
1841	200,442	+2.5%
1851	141,823	−29.2%
1861	126,482	−10.8%
1871	114,969	−9.1%
1881	102,748	−10.6%
1891	86,206	−16.1%
1901	74,611	−13.5%
1911	71,455	−4.2%
1926	65,131	−8.9%
1936	61,289	−5.9%
1946	57,215	−6.6%
1951	55,345	−3.3%
1956	52,064	−5.9%
1961	47,088	−9.6%
1966	45,732	−2.9%
1971	46,242	+1.1%
1979	50,376	+8.9%
1981	51,192	+1.6%
1986	52,379	+2.3%
1991	51,293	−2.1%
1996	51,313	+0.0%
2002	52,593	+2.5%
2006	55,997	+6.5%
2011	60,483	+8.0%
2016	61,386	+1.5%
2022	65,288	+6.4%

=== Baronies ===
- Cremorne (Irish: Críoch Mhúrn)
- Dartree (Irish: Dartraighe)
- Farney (Irish: Fearnaigh)
- Monaghan (Irish: Muineachán)
- Truagh (Irish: An Triúcha)

=== Towns and villages ===
- Ballinode
- Ballybay
- Carrickmacross
- Castleblayney
- Clones
- Clontibret
- Doohamlet
- Drum
- Emyvale
- Inniskeen
- Glaslough
- Killanny
- Knockatallon
- Magheracloone
- Monaghan
- Newbliss
- Oram
- Rockcorry
- Scotshouse
- Scotstown
- Smithborough
- Threemilehouse
- Tydavnet
- Tyholland

=== Largest towns ===
As of the 2022 census:

1. Monaghan – 7,894
2. Carrickmacross – 5,745
3. Castleblayney – 3,926
4. Clones – 1,885
5. Ballybay – 1,329

=== Geography ===
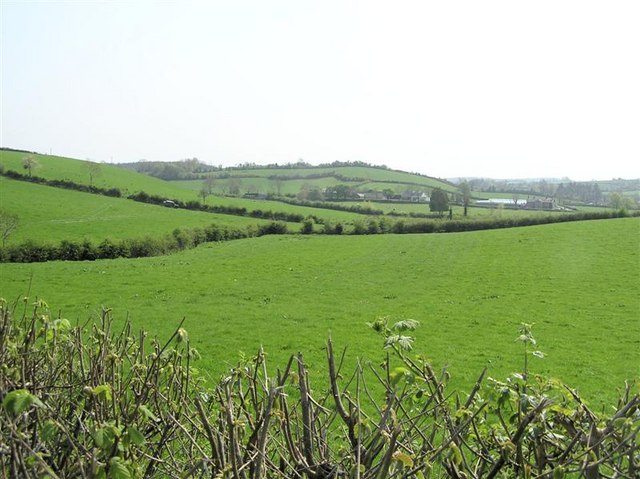
Shannahergoa countryside.

Notable mountains include Slieve Beagh (on the Tyrone and Fermanagh borders), Mullyash Mountain and Coolberrin Hill (214 m, 702 ft). Lakes include Lough Avaghon, Dromore Lough, Drumlona Lough, Lough Egish, Emy Lough, Lough Fea, Inner Lough (in Dartrey Forest), Muckno Lough and White Lough. Notable rivers include the River Fane (along the Louth border), the River Glyde (along the Louth and Meath borders), the Ulster Blackwater (along the Tyrone border), and the Dromore River (along the Cavan border, linking Cootehill to Ballybay).

Monaghan has a number of forests, including Rossmore Forest and Dartrey Forest. Managed by Coillte since 1988, the majority of trees are conifers. Because of a long history of intensive farming and recent intensive forestry practices, only small pockets of native woodland remain.

The Finn Bridge is a border crossing point over the River Finn to County Fermanagh. It is close to Scotshouse.

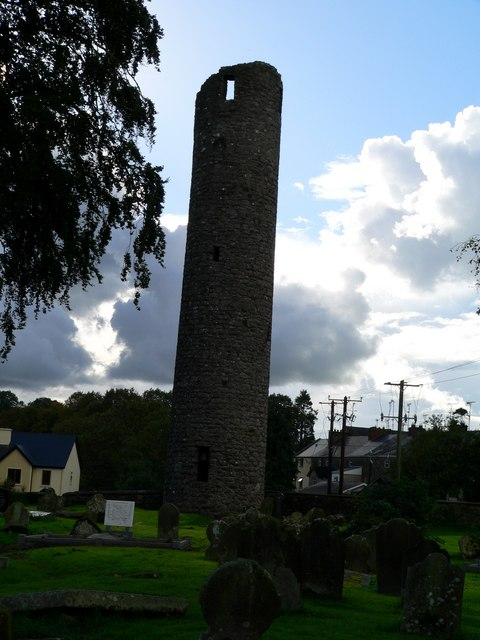
Clones Round Tower

== Geology ==
Lead used to be mined in County Monaghan. Mines included Annaglogh Lead Mines and Lisdrumgormley Lead Mines.

== History ==
Monaghan has a number of ancient burial sites (court cairns, dolmens and wedge tombs) spread across the county.

In 1585, the English Lord Deputy of Ireland, Sir John Perrot, visited the area and met the Irish chieftains. They requested that Ulster be divided into counties and land in the kingdom of Airgíalla be apportioned to the local chiefs. A commission was established to accomplish this and County Monaghan came into being. The county was subdivided into five baronies: Farney, Cremorne, Dartrey, and Monaghan controlled by MacMahon and Truagh by McKenna.

After the defeat of the rebellion of The Earl of Tyrone and the Ulster chieftains in 1603, the county was not planted like the other counties of Ulster. The lands were instead left in the hands of the native chieftains. In the Irish Rebellion of 1641, the McMahons and their allies joined the general rebellion of Irish Catholics. Following their defeat, some colonisation of the county took place by Scottish and English families.

== Inland waterways ==
County Monaghan is traversed by the derelict Ulster Canal. However, Waterways Ireland are embarking on a scheme to reopen the canal from Lough Erne into Clones.

== Railways ==
The Ulster Railway linked Monaghan with Armagh and Belfast in 1858 and with the Dundalk and Enniskillen Railway at Clones in 1863. It became part of the Great Northern Railway (GNR) in 1876. The partition of Ireland in 1922 turned the boundary with County Armagh into an international frontier, after which trains were routinely delayed by customs inspections. In 1957, the Government of Northern Ireland made the GNR Board close the line between Portadown and Armagh, and all lines between Armagh and County Monaghan. This left the GNR Board with no option but to withdraw passenger services between Armagh and Clones as well. CIÉ took over the remaining section of line between Clones, Monaghan and Glaslough in 1958, but withdrew goods services between Monaghan and Glaslough in 1959 and between Clones and Monaghan in 1960, leaving Monaghan with no railway service.

== Governance and politics ==
The island of Ireland, showing location of County Monaghan.

=== Local government ===
At the 2024 local election, County Monaghan was divided into three local electoral areas, each of formed a municipal district: Ballybay–Clones, Carrickmacross–Castleblayney, and Monaghan.

2024 local election Monaghan County Council
Party	Seats	Change
Sinn Féin	8	+2
Fine Gael	6	+1
Fianna Fáil	3	-1
Independent	1	-2

=== Former districts ===
The towns of Ballybay, Carrickmacross, Castleblayney, Clones and Monaghan were formerly represented by nine-member town councils which dealt with local matters such as the provision of utilities and housing. These were abolished in 2014 under the Local Government Reform Act 2014.

=== National politics ===
For elections to Dáil Éireann, the county is part of the constituency of Cavan–Monaghan which elects five TDs. In the 2024 general election, there was a voter turnout of 64%.

For elections to the European Parliament, the county is part of the Midlands–North-West constituency.

== Culture and architecture ==
County Monaghan is the birthplace of the poet and writer Patrick Kavanagh, who based much of his work in the county. Kavanagh is one of the most significant figures in 20th-century Irish poetry. The poems "Stony Grey Soil" and "Shancoduff" refer to the county.

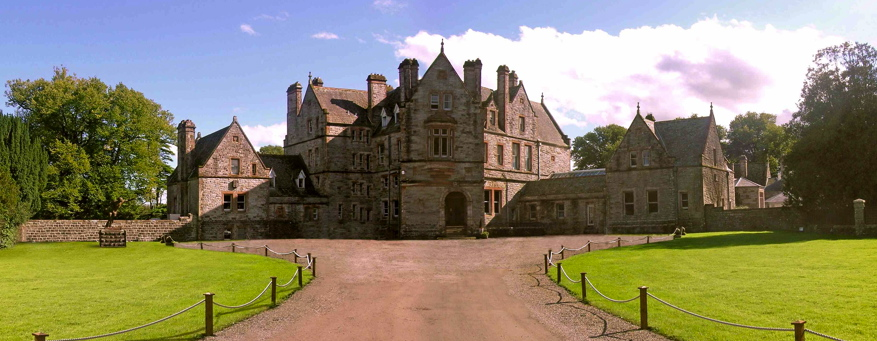
Castle Leslie

County Monaghan has produced several successful artists. Chief among these is George Collie (1904–75), who was born in Carrickmacross and trained at the Dublin Metropolitan School of Art. He was a prolific exhibitor at the Royal Hibernian Academy throughout his lifetime and is represented by works in the collection of the National Gallery of Ireland and the Ulster Museum.

County Monaghan was also the home county of the Irish writer Sir Shane Leslie (1885–1971), 3rd Baronet of Glaslough, who lived at Castle Leslie in the north-east corner of the county. A Catholic convert, Irish nationalist and first cousin of Sir Winston Churchill, Prime Minister of the United Kingdom, Leslie became an important literary figure in the early 1900s. He was a close friend of many politicians and writers of the day including the American novelist F. Scott Fitzgerald (1896–1940), who dedicated his second novel, The Beautiful and Damned, to Leslie.

Monaghan County Museum is recognised as one of the leading provincial museums in Ireland, with a Council of Europe Award (1980), among others, to its credit. Located in Hill Street, Monaghan Town, the museum aims to reflect the history of County Monaghan and its people in all its richness and diversity.

The best of the county's architecture developed in the Georgian and Victorian periods and ranges from the dignified public spaces of Church Square and The Diamond in Monaghan Town to the great country houses of Lough Fea, Carrickmacross; Hilton Park, Clones and Castle Leslie, Glaslough.

Significant ecclesiastical buildings include St Joseph's Catholic Church in Carrickmacross; the Gothic-Revival St Patrick's Church of Ireland Church, Monaghan Town, and St Macartan's Catholic Cathedral, Monaghan Town, by James Joseph McCarthy (1817–1882).

== Economy ==
Agriculture is a significant part of the County Monaghan economy, employing about 12% of the population in 2011 (compared with 5% nationally). The county is the main source of egg supplies in the Republic of Ireland.

== Notable people ==
=== Literature and scholarship ===
- John Robert Gregg (1867–1948) – Pioneer of modern shorthand writing.
- Sir Tyrone Guthrie (1900–1971) – Writer, theatrical director and founder of the Tyrone Guthrie Centre. Born in Royal Tunbridge Wells, his maternal grandmother was from Newbliss. He settled at Annaghmakerrig House in County Monaghan late in his life.
- Patrick Kavanagh (1904–1967) – Poet
- Sir Shane Leslie, 3rd Baronet (1885–1971) – Writer and political activist, 3rd Baronet of Glaslough and first-cousin of Sir Winston Churchill. Resided at Castle Leslie.
- Eugene McCabe (1930–2020) – Playwright, novelist and screenwriter, also a member of Aosdána. Lived in Clones.
- Patrick McCabe (born 1955) – Novelist and member of Aosdána
- Evelyn Shirley – Writer and antiquarian. Resided at Lough Fea House near Carrickmacross.

=== Politics and military ===
- Andrew, 11th Baron Blayney (1770–1834), a prominent military commander with the British Army, especially during the Napoleonic Wars. Also had Castleblayney, his estate town, rebuilt in the early nineteenth century.
- Sir Charles Gavan Duffy (12 April 1816 – 9 February 1903), Irish Nationalist and Australian politician who served as Prime Minister of the Colony of Victoria. Born in Monaghan town.
- Joseph Finegan (17 November 1814 – 29 October 1885), Confederate General and victor at the Battle of Olustee
- Francis Fitzpatrick (1859–1933), recipient of the Victoria Cross
- James Gillespie (1747–1805), an officer in the North Carolina militia in the American Revolutionary War and a United States Congressman
- Thomas Hughes (1885–1942), Soldier and recipient of the Victoria Cross.
- Sir Basil Kelly (1920–2008) - UUP politician and senior-ranking Northern Irish judge. He served as the last Attorney General for Northern Ireland under the old Stormont regime, serving in the late 1960s and early 1970s. Born in County Monaghan but raised and educated in Belfast.
- Charles Davis Lucas (1834–1914), A native of County Armagh who was the first-ever recipient of the Victoria Cross. Resided for a time at Castleshane.
- Jim Lynagh, Commander East Tyrone Brigade IRA
- Juan Mackenna (1771–1814), veteran of the Chilean War of Independence and Co-Liberator of Chile.
- Heber MacMahon, Lord Bishop of Clogher - Catholic prelate who also served as a military commander for the 'Confederation of Kilkenny' during the 1640s. He commanded at the Battle of Scarrifholis, near Letterkenny, in 1650. Bishop MacMahon was born in Inishkeen.
- Séamus McElwaine, OC South Fermanagh Brigade IRA
- Patricia McKenna, former MEP
- David Nelson, recipient of the Victoria Cross
- General Eoin O'Duffy (20 October 1892 – 30 November 1944), turns Chief of Staff of the Irish Republican Army, Commissioner of the Garda Síochána and leader of the Blueshirts and of Fine Gael. He was also Commander of the Irish Brigade in the Spanish Civil War. Born near Castleblayney.
- Fergal O'Hanlon (1936–1957), IRA volunteer, killed during the Border Campaign.
- Rory O'Hanlon, politician, former Ceann Comhairle and former cabinet minister. Born 1934.
- David Storey (1856–1924), member of the New South Wales Legislative Assembly
- Thomas Taggart (1856–1929), United States Senator and Mayor of Indianapolis.
- Sir William Whitla (1851–1933), physician and politician. Born and raised in Monaghan Town.

=== Sport ===
- Dame Mary Bailey (1890–1960), aviator who was the daughter of The 5th Baron Rossmore and wife of Sir Abe Bailey, the South African 'Randlord'.
- Tommy Bowe (born 1980), Rugby Union player, born in Monaghan town
- Kevin McBride, Olympic Boxer
- Barry McGuigan (born 1960), world boxing champion 1985. Born in Clones.
- Daniel McKenna (born 1987), rally driver
- John McKenna (1855–1936), the first manager of Liverpool Football Club along with W.E. Barclay.
- James Cecil Parke (1881–1946), Tennis and rugby player. Olympic silver medalist in tennis, twice winner of the Wimbledon Mixed Doubles title and Australian Men's Singles title winner. Captain of the Irish rugby team

=== Music and entertainment ===
- Oliver Callan (born 1980), satirist and mimic, born County Monaghan
- Terry Cavanagh, video game designer
- Conor Curley, Fontaines D.C. guitarist
- The Flaws, indie rock band from Carrickmacross
- "Big Tom" McBride (1936–2018), country singer
- Ryan Sheridan, singer and guitarist

=== Acting ===
- Caitriona Balfe, fashion model and actress
- Aoibhinn McGinnity, actress
- Charlene McKenna, actress
- Ardal O'Hanlon, actor and comedian

=== Art ===
- Alexander Williams (1846–1930), artist, born in Monaghan town.

=== Religion ===
- Dr John Darley (1799–1884), Church of Ireland Lord Bishop of Kilmore, Elphin and Ardagh, 1874–84.
- George Jeffreys (1889–1962), Welsh founder of the Elim Pentecostal Church, which was first established in Monaghan town in 1915. The movement now has some 9,000 churches worldwide.
- Ellen McKenna (1819–1883), Irish Sisters of Mercy nun, American civil war nurse and teacher.

== Twin cities ==
County Monaghan is twinned with the following places:

- Geel, Flanders, Belgium
- Prince Edward Island, Canada
- Miramichi, New Brunswick, Canada
- Peterborough, Ontario, Canada

== See also ==
- List of abbeys and priories in the Republic of Ireland (County Monaghan)
- List of national monuments in County Monaghan
- Lord Lieutenant of Monaghan
- High Sheriff of Monaghan
