= Cadwallader Blayney, 9th Baron Blayney =

British Army officer and freemason

Lieutenant-General The Right Honourable The Lord Blayney
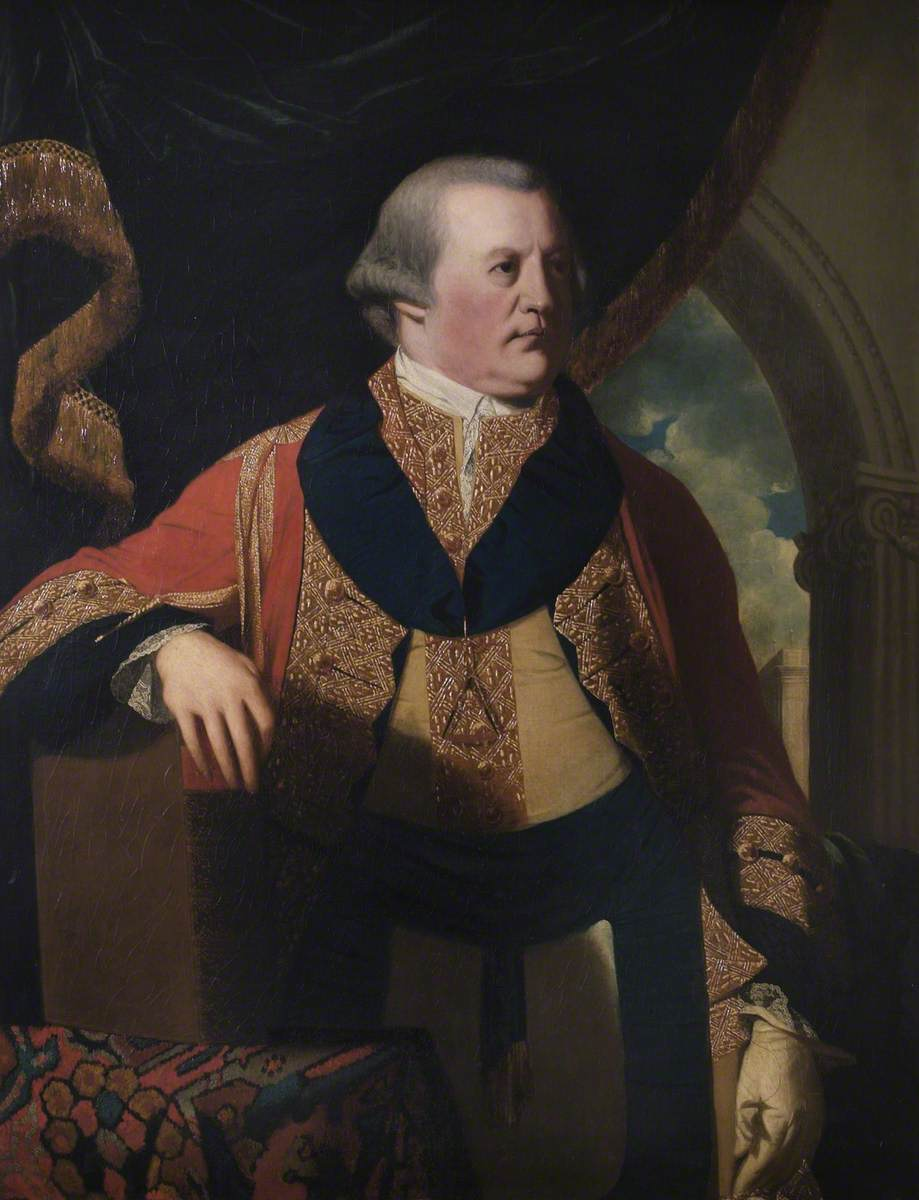
- Blayney in masonic uniform c.1766
- Born: 2 May 1720
- Died: 21 November 1775 (aged 55)
- Burial place: Castleblayney, Ireland
- Military career
- Allegiance: Great Britain
- Branch: British Army
- Rank: Lieutenant-General
- Commands: 91st Regiment of Foot
- Conflicts: War of the Austrian Succession; Siege of Louisbourg

Lieutenant-General Cadwallader Blayney, 9th Baron Blayney (2 May 1720 – 21 November 1775) was a British Army officer and freemason. Having fought during the War of the Austrian Succession, he became colonel of the regiment to the 38th Regiment of Foot in 1766. He served as Grand Master of the Premier Grand Lodge of England between 1764 and 1767.

== Early life ==
Cadwallader Blayney was born on 2 May 1720, the son of Cadwallader Blayney, 7th Baron Blayney, an Irish peer.

== Military career ==
Blayney served as a captain in Pepperrell's Regiment during the War of the Austrian Succession. He fought at the Siege of Louisbourg in 1745 and continued on in North America, commanding the regiment in 1747 when the commanding officer was cashiered. Blayney was promoted to major on 25 February 1747, joining Shirley's Regiment, and then transferred to the Coldstream Guards upon promotion to lieutenant-colonel on 26 June 1753.

Blayney raised the 91st Regiment of Foot in Ireland in 1759, becoming its first and only lieutenant-colonel-commandant. He was then advanced to brevet colonel in 1761. On 29 September the same year he inherited the family title as Baron Blayney on the death of his older brother Charles Blayney, 8th Baron Blayney. Continuing in the army, Blayney was promoted to major-general in 1765 and in the following year was appointed colonel of the regiment to the 38th Regiment of Foot.

Blayney was subsequently promoted to lieutenant-general on 26 May 1772 and held command at Munster until his death on 21 November 1775. He was buried at Castleblayney.

== Freemasonry ==
Blayney was appointed Grand Master of the Premier Grand Lodge of England in 1764. He had probably been part of a military lodge prior to this, having been initiated into freemasonry when young. Supportive of the ritualistic traditions of the freemasons, Blayney constituted seventy-four new lodges before he relinquished his role in 1767.

== Personal life ==
Blayney married Elizabeth Eloise Tipping on 20 December 1767. She died on 17 May 1775. They had four children:

- Cadwallader Blayney, 10th Baron Blayney
- Andrew Blayney, 11th Baron Blayney
- Sophia Blayney
- Mary Blayney

== Citations ==
Military offices
Preceded by Sharrington Talbot	Colonel of the 38th Regiment of Foot; 1766–1775	Succeeded by Robert Pigot
Masonic offices
Preceded by The Earl Ferrers	Grand Master of the Premier Grand Lodge of England; 1764–1767	Succeeded by The Duke of Beaufort
Peerage of Ireland
Preceded by Charles Blayney	Baron Blayney; 1761–1775	Succeeded by Cadwallader Blayney
