= Franciszek Młokosiewicz =

Polish general (1769–1845)

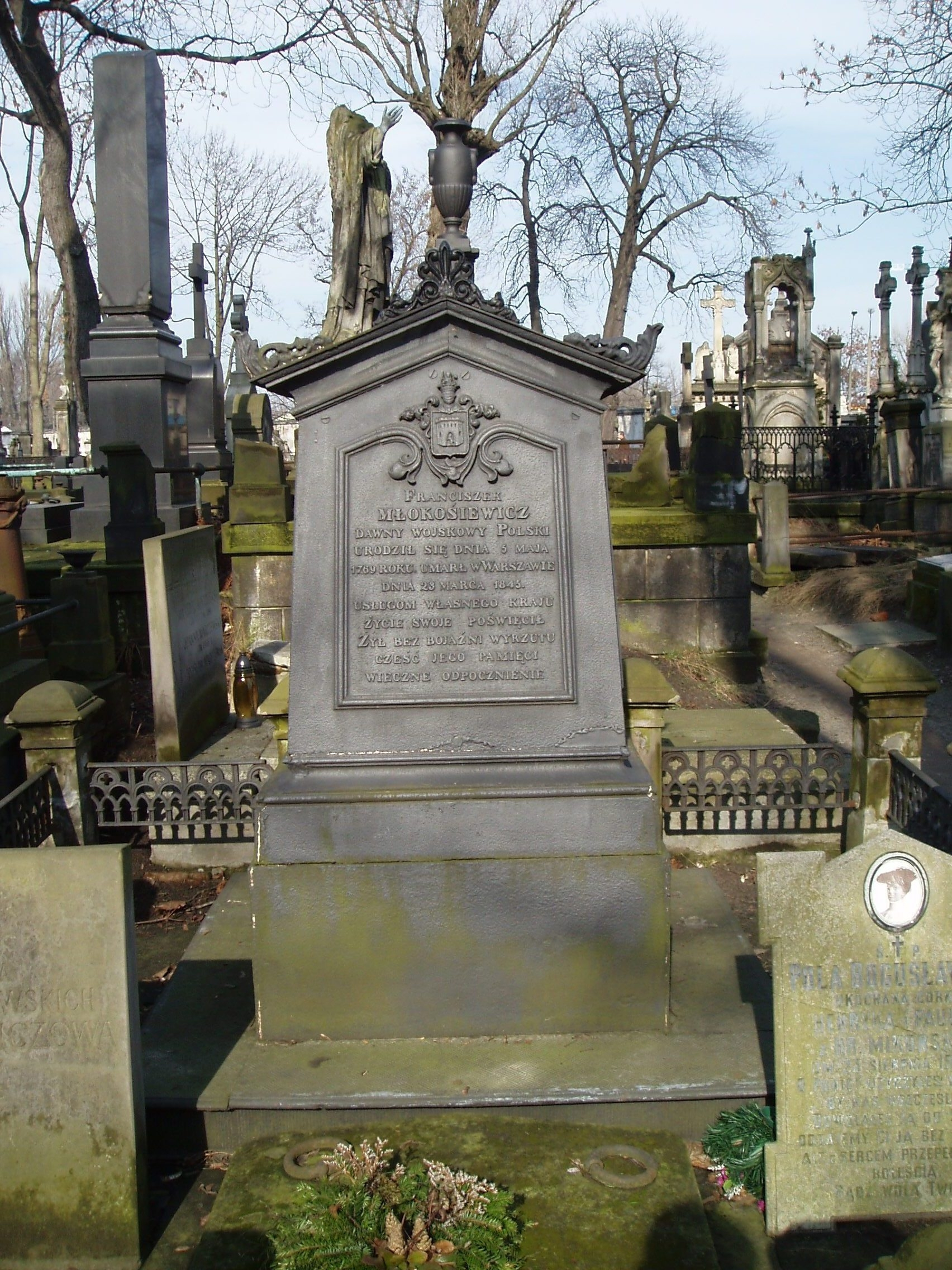
Franciszek Młokosiewicz

Franciszek Młokosiewicz (May 5, 1769, Koźminek – March 23, 1845, Warsaw) was a Polish officer who served during the Napoleonic Wars and the November Uprising. He served in the Army of the Duchy of Warsaw and participated in the Battle of Fuengirola.

== Military career ==
The importance of the Battle of Fuengirola was downplayed in both contemporary French and British memoirs. In his memoirs Andrew Blayney denied he was taken captive by the Poles and said it was one of the Society of United Irishmen who captured him. Nevertheless, Blayney's sabre surrendered at Fuengirola remains on display in Kraków's Czartoryski Museum.

Following retirement he settled in his wife's manor in Omięcin near Szydłowiec. Although only a Major, he was referred to as "The General" by the local population.

During the November Uprising, Młokosiewicz rejoined the Polish Armed Forces. As the Polish Land Forces were lacking experienced field officers, Młokosiewicz (then 61 and in bad health) was accepted and promoted to the military rank of Colonel.

He served with distinction until the final Battle of Warsaw. Despite his tactical successes in the borough of Wola, which pushed back the initial assault, Młokosiewicz's force was defeated the following day, and Warsaw fell to the Imperial Russian Army.

Three years before his death, Młokosiewicz published his own account of the Battle of Fuengirola and his part in the Peninsular War. It was in large part a reaction to inconsistencies in Blayney's memoirs.

Młokosiewicz is buried at Warsaw's Powązki Cemetery.

== Personal life ==
Młokosiewicz married Anna Janikowska I voto Guźniewska and had three children. They had two sons: Konstanty Młokosiewicz and Ludwik Młokosiewicz, a botanist. Their daughter, Helena Mikorska, who married Count Roman Mikorski and died in 1901, is best known as the person to whom Frédéric Chopin donated his Mazurka in G major.
