= Castleblayney Town Hall =

Municipal building in Castleblayney, County Monaghan, Ireland

- Halla an Bhaile Bhaile na Lorgan
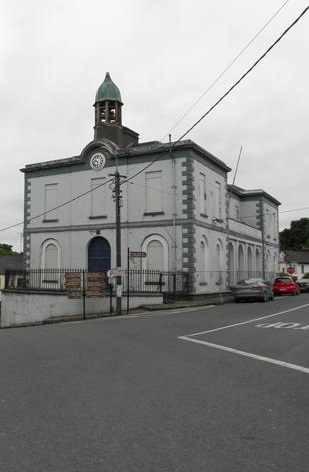
- Castleblayney Town Hall

- Location within Ireland

General information
- Architectural style: Italianate style
- Location: Market Square, Castleblayney, Ireland
- Coordinates: 54.1204°N 6.7339°W
- Completed: 1790

Castleblayney Town Hall (Irish: Halla an Bhaile Bhaile na Lorgan) is a municipal building in the Market Square at Castleblayney, County Monaghan, Ireland. It has served as a market house, as a town hall and as a courthouse, but is currently disused and standing derelict.

== History ==
The building was commissioned as a market house for the town by Andrew Blayney, 11th Baron Blayney, whose seat was at Blayney Castle, and was intended to support the local linen trade. The site he selected was an elevated location in the centre of the Market Square. It was designed in the Italianate style, built in rubble masonry with a cement render finish and was completed in its original form around 1790.

The design involved a symmetrical main frontage of eight bays facing southwest onto the Market Square. The central section of four bays featured a loggia with four round headed openings on the ground floor, and four sash windows behind a parapet and a large recess on the first floor. The end sections of two bays each, which were slightly projected forward, were fenestrated by slightly recessed round headed windows on the ground floor and by sash windows with window sills on the first floor. The rear elevation of the building, which was accessed further down the slope of the hill, incorporated a basement floor which was arcaded, so that markets could be held, and was unrendered. At roof level, there was a bell tower with an ogee-shaped dome at the northwest end of the building. Internally, the principal room was a large assembly room on the first floor.

A three-bay courthouse extension, which was projected outward at the rear of the building, was added in 1856. After the town commissioners were replaced by an urban district council in 1899, the new council adopted the building as its meeting place. The council continued to operate from the building until the late 20th century, when it relocated to offices in Main Street. Monaghan County Council then condemned the building as unsafe and local hearings of the district court and of the circuit court were relocated to Hope Castle in 1997.

A statue of the country singer, Tom McBride, was unveiled at the back of the building by President of Ireland, Michael D. Higgins, in September 2018.

=== Deterioration ===
After the collapse of an internal wall in 2019, Monaghan County Council instructed contractors to stabilise the exterior walls and to remove the partially collapsed roof. In April 2023, Monaghan County Council commissioned DHB Architects to prepare design proposals for the refurbishment of the building.
