= Henry Blayney, 2nd Baron Blayney =

Irish baron

Rt. Hon. Henry Blayney, 2nd Baron Blayney, Baron of Monaghan (d. 5 June 1646 at the Battle of Benburb) was the son of Edward Blayney, 1st Baron, and of Ann Loftus his wife, daughter of Adam Loftus, Archbishop of Dublin and sometime Lord Chancellor of Ireland, by his wife Jane Purdon.

== Biography ==
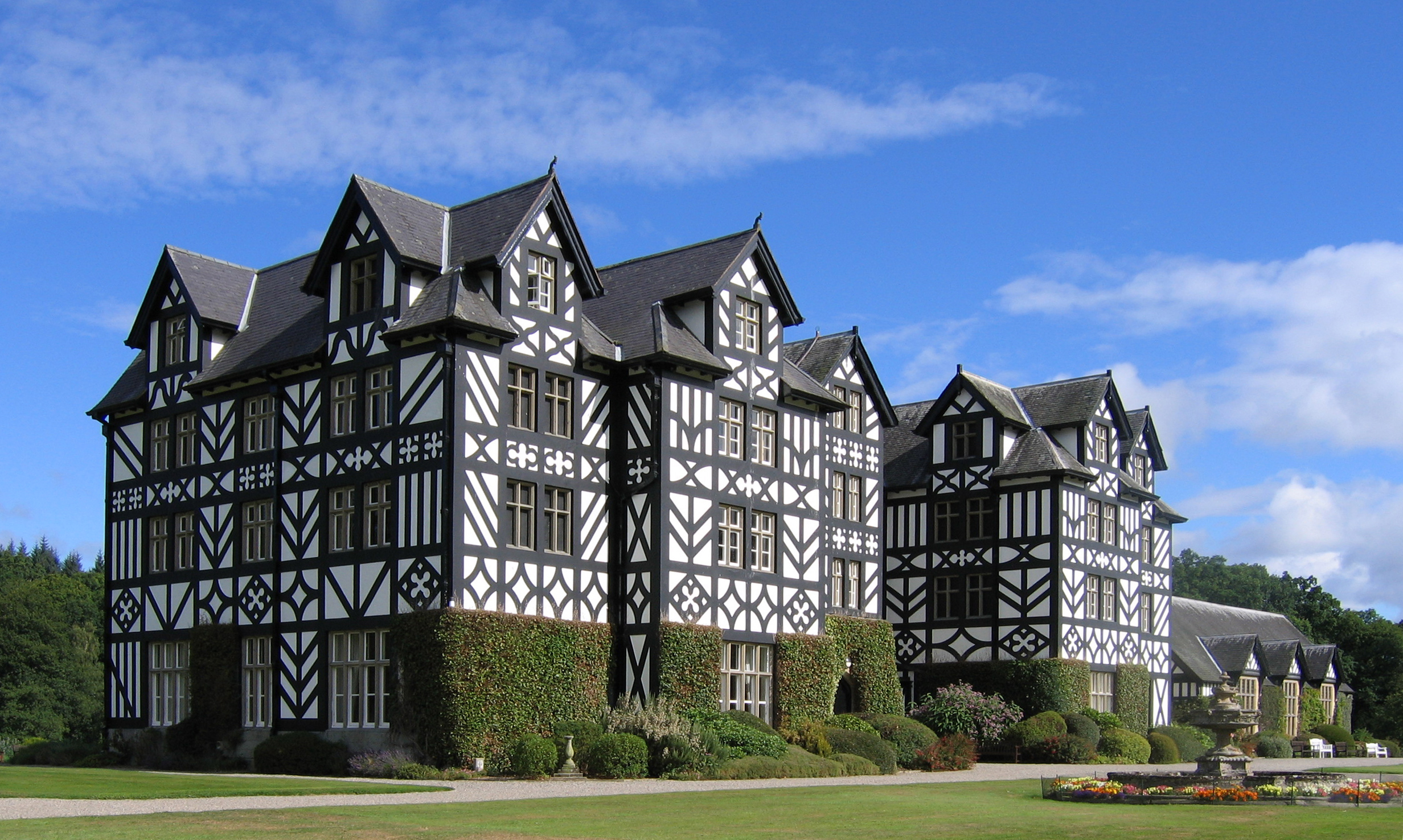
Gregynog Hall, the Blayney family's ancestral home

Henry's father Edward, 1st Baron Blayney, was a younger son of David Lloyd Blayney of Gregynog Hall in Tregynon, Montgomeryshire and his wife Elizabeth Jones. Edward was a distinguished soldier and politician who was a member of the Irish House of Commons and the Privy Council of Ireland, and Governor of Monaghan. He was granted substantial lands in Monaghan, with his principal estate near Lough Muckno. He was the founder of the town of Castleblayney, and was created Baron Blayney in 1621. His wealth enabled him to give his daughter a dowry of £1200. In the 1620s, Edward was described as having great influence at the English Court. On Edward's death in 1629 his title and estates passed to Henry, the eldest son and heir. Henry, with his father, spent much of the 1620s fighting a bitter lawsuit with his brother-in-law James Balfour, 1st Baron Balfour of Glenawley. Balfour, already an old man, married Henry's teenage sister Anne for her money, but refused to pay her jointure, having bullied her into a confession of adultery, which was almost certainly false. The Blayneys complained that Balfour was trying to ruin them, but they had sufficient influence to have the matter settled by arbitration; and it was Balfour, not Lord Blayney, who died a relatively poor man.

Henry Blayney witnessed the outbreak of the Irish Rebellion of 1641; "who, at the surprisal of his house at Castleblayney by the Irish rebels on the 23rd of October, 1641, brought the news of that outbreak to Dublin. During the rebellion he kept the little fort of Monaghan with the 97th Foot until the fatal Battle of Benburb, in the County of Tyrone, in which he lost his life at the head of his men, fighting against Felim O'Neill, 5th of June, 1646, and was buried at Monaghan."

In 1643 Lord Blayney swore in a legal deposition: ..that he lost his castle at Blayney in County Monaghan, together with goods and riding horses worth £237, plate (£500), linen (£500), and beasts, cattle and sheep (£925). There was ‘More howsholdstuff in his 2 howses worth at least 1000 markes, ready money £296, due debts £400, a library of bookes worth £500’, besides other things that he could not recall. In all, Blayney estimated that the insurgents had inflicted £13,873–8–4 worth of damage on his property, goods and livestock, and that he had lost an annual rental of £2,250.

== Family ==
Henry Blayney was married to The Right Honourable Jane, Lady Blayney, daughter of Garret Moore, 1st Viscount Moore, and of Mary his wife, daughter of Sir Henry Colley of Carbury, County Kildare and Catherine Cusack, and had issue 6 sons and 6 daughters, viz. (the following is adapted from the funeral entry of the above Lady Jane Blayney in the Ulster's office):

- Edward 3rd Baron Blayney, the eldest son, died unmarried, and was buried in the Church of St Martin-in-the-Fields, London.
- Charles second son, died young and was buried in the Church of Monaghan.
- Richard, 4th Baron Blayney, third son, was buried in St Michan's Church, Dublin. He took to his first wife Elizabeth daughter of John Mallock, of Devonshire, and relict of Hugh Willoughby, by whom he had no issue. He took to his second wife Elizabeth, daughter of Thomas Vincent, of London, Alderman, by whom he has had issue five sons and four daughters, viz. :
  - Vincent eldest son, died young and was buried in London.
  - Henry, now 5th Baron Blayney, second son, Captain of a Troop of Horse in Ireland.
  - Edward, third, and – Thomas, fourth son, both died young, and were buried in Monaghan.
  - William, fifth son, now Captain of a foot company in Ireland.
  - Jane, eldest daughter, married to Blayney Owens, gent.
  - Sarah, second daughter married Captain Morris Annesley, son of John Annesley, of Ballyshannon, Esq., who is brother to the Rt. Hon. the Earl of Anglesey.
  - Elizabeth, third daughter is unmarried.
  - Johanna Maria, fourth daughter died young and was buried in Monaghan.
- Arthur fourth son died unmarried and was buried in Castle Blayney.
- Garratt, fifth son died at the Hague, unmarried.
- John, sixth son died at the West Indies, unmarried.
- Thomasin, eldest daughter, was first married to Thomas Sandford, of Cantwell's Court, Gowran, County Kilkenny, Esq., by whom she had issue ten children. She was subsequently married to Joseph Fox of Graige, in County Tipperary, gent., by whom she had issue: five children that died in their infancy and five now living, including Henry Fox, father of George Fox-Lane, 1st Baron Bingley.
- Penelope second daughter married Hugh Morgan of Cottlestowne in County Sligo, gent., son of Captain Morgan and of Bridget his wife, daughter of Robert Blayney of Tregonog aforesaid, who was nephew to the first Edward Lord Blayney; By which Hugh Morgan the said Penelope had issue two children that died young, and two now living, including Eleanor who married William Tisdall.
- Mary, third daughter, was first married to Capt Henry Moreton of Newtowne in the County Meath, by whom she had no issue, she was secondly married to Charles Meredith, Esq., eldest son of Sir Thomas Meredith, Knt., and of Lettice his wife daughter of Sir Faithful Fortescue, Knt. and of Anne, his wife daughter of the aforesaid Lord Viscount Drogheda, by which Charles the said Mary has had issue,- Henry now living, and another that died young. The said Mary, third daughter, lies interred in the Church of Kells.
- Penelope, fourth daughter, died young, and was buried in St Peter's Church, Drogheda.
- Sarah, fifth daughter yet unmarried, and
- Jane, sixth daughter married to Col. John Georges of Somerfeat, County Londonderry by whom she has had issue one son – Henry unmarried and one daughter Elizabeth, married to Captain Frederick Hamilton.

"The trueth of the Premisses is testified by the subscription of the Rt Honourable Henry now Lord Blayney, Baron of Monaghan (herein before mentioned) grandson of the defunct, who hath returned this certificate to be recorded in the office of Sir Richard Carney, Knt., Ulster King of Arms, this twenty-eight-day of December, Anno Domini, one thousand six hundred and eighty six."

Jane, Lady Blayney, wife of Henry Blayney "died at her lodgings on the Merchant's Key 22nd October 1686, and was interred 26 October of the same year, in St. Michan's Church in Oxmantown".

== See also ==
- Baron Blayney

Peerage of Ireland
Preceded by Edward Blayney	Baron Blayney; 1629–1646	Succeeded by Edward Blayney
