= Joseph Ruddell =

Joseph Ruddell was an Irish Anglican priest: he was Archdeacon of Clogher from 1923 until 1937.

Ruddell was born at Clonroot on 9 November 1866, and educated at the Royal University of Ireland, Trinity College, Dublin and Queen's University Belfast. He was a maths teacher at Rathmines School then Drogheda Grammar School. He was ordained deacon in 1893 and priest in 1894. After curacies in Muckno and Clones he was the incumbent at Castle Archdale then Clones.

The Diocese of Clogher awards a prize in his honour.
