= William Sawrey Gilpin =

English painter (1762–1843)

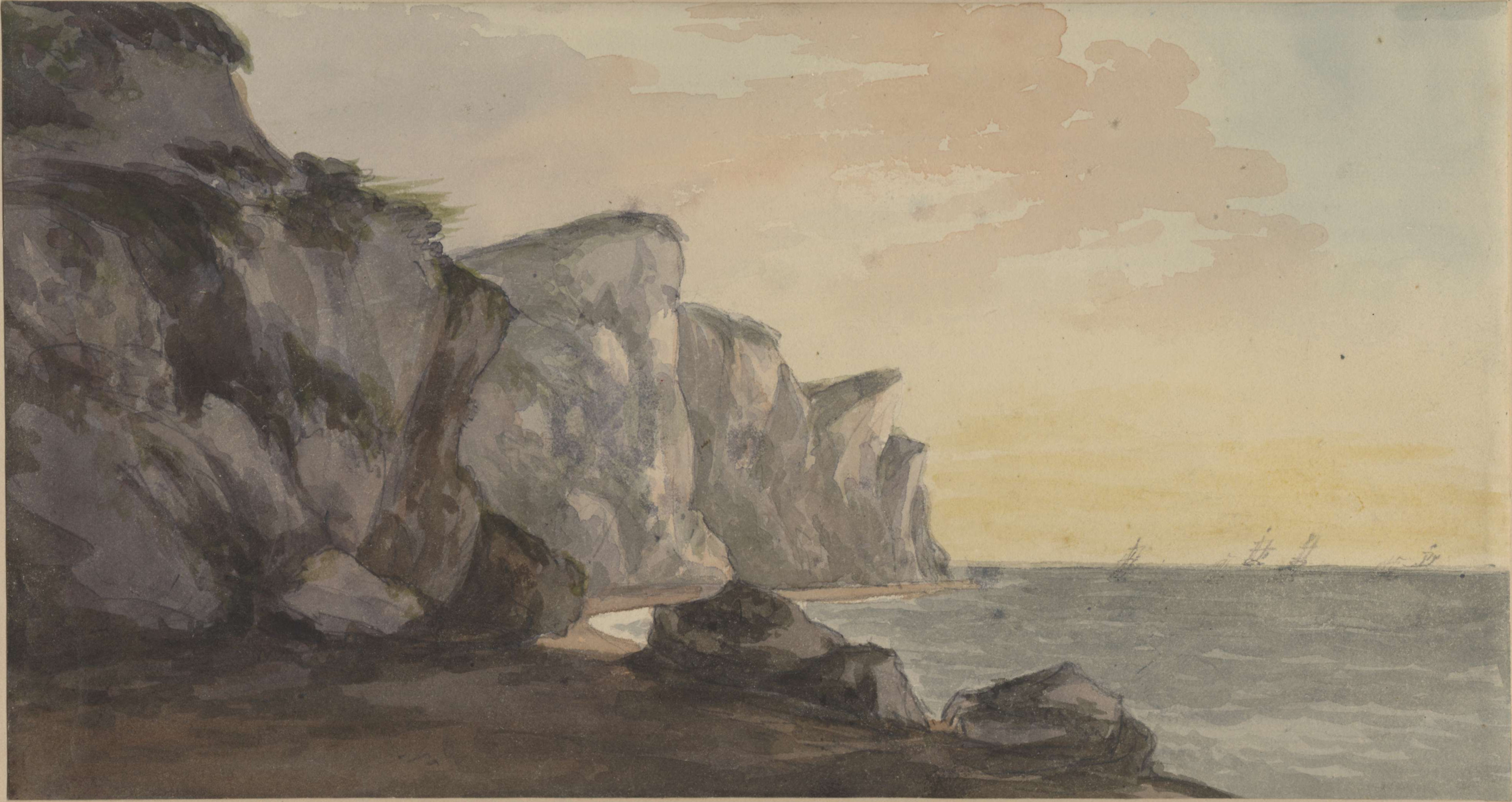
Coast Scene

William Sawrey Gilpin (4 October 1762 – 4 April 1843) was an English artist and drawing master, and in later life a landscape designer.

== Biography ==
Gilpin was born at Scaleby Castle, Cumbria, on 4 October 1762, the son of the animal painter Sawrey Gilpin. He attended the school of his uncle, William Gilpin (originator of the Picturesque), at Cheam in Surrey. He married Elizabeth Paddock; they had two (or possibly three) sons, one of whom seems to have remained dependent on his father. He died at Sedbury Hall, North Yorkshire, the house of his cousin the Reverend John Gilpin, and is buried nearby in the churchyard at Gilling West.

== Artist ==
In the 1780s, Gilpin taught himself the relatively new aquatint process of printmaking, to produce plates to illustrate his uncle's books on picturesque scenery. Gilpin specialised in watercolours; and in 1804 was elected first President of the Society of Painters in Water-Colours. He was patronised by Sir George Beaumont, through whom he met the picturesque theorist Uvedale Price.

== Drawing master ==
In 1806, Gilpin took a post as drawing master at the Royal Military College, Great Marlow (which moved to Sandhurst in 1812), teaching cadets to make accurate records of the landscape and the lie of enemy positions. This apparently secure employment came to a sudden end in 1820, when he was made redundant in a round of post-Napoleonic Wars cutbacks, at the age of nearly sixty.

== Landscape gardener ==
To support his family, Gilpin turned to a career as a landscape gardener, for which he had little qualification or experience beyond an artist's eye. He was helped and encouraged in this by Uvedale Price, whose theories on picturesque landscaping clearly accorded well with his own ideas. Gilpin's work also shows the influence of the later work of Price's old adversary Humphry Repton, who had died in 1818.

Gilpin seems to have been remarkably successful. In his short landscape design career he reputedly worked at "some hundreds" of sites. Relatively few designs survive on paper or unaltered on the ground. Features employed by Gilpin included amoeba-shaped flower beds, gently curving paths through irregular shrubberies, and raised terrace walks.

Sites where he is known to have worked include:

- Bowhill House, Scottish Borders
- Scotney Castle in Kent
- Nuneham House in Oxfordshire, where he laid out the Pinetum which now forms the core of the Harcourt Arboretum attached to the Oxford Botanic Garden.
- Shaw Hill in Lancashire
- Audley End House in Essex
- Marston Bigot Park, Marston Bigot, Somerset.
- Wolterton Hall in Norfolk.
- Blayney Castle in Castleblayney, County Monaghan, Ireland. He was commissioned by Lieutenant-General The 11th Baron Blayney to improve the demesne or park surrounding the 'castle' in the early 1830s.
- Crom Castle near Newtownbutler in the south-east of County Fermanagh in Ireland. He was commissioned by Colonel John Creichton (who later became The 3rd Earl of Erne) to design some landscaping works at the newly completed Crom Castle, these works being carried out in 1834 and 1835.

== Author ==
In 1832, Gilpin published Practical Hints upon Landscape Gardening: with some remarks on Domestic Architecture, as connected with scenery, which ran to a second edition in 1835.
