= Cadwallader Blayney, 10th Baron Blayney =

Irish noble

Cadwallader Blayney, 10th Baron Blayney (1769 – 2 April 1784) became a lord in 1775, and lived on the family estate in Castleblayney, Ireland. He died in 1784.

Peerage of Ireland
Preceded by Cadwallader Blayney	Baron Blayney; 1775–1784	Succeeded by Andrew Blayney
