= 4th Infantry Regiment (Duchy of Warsaw) =

- 4 Pułk Piechoty
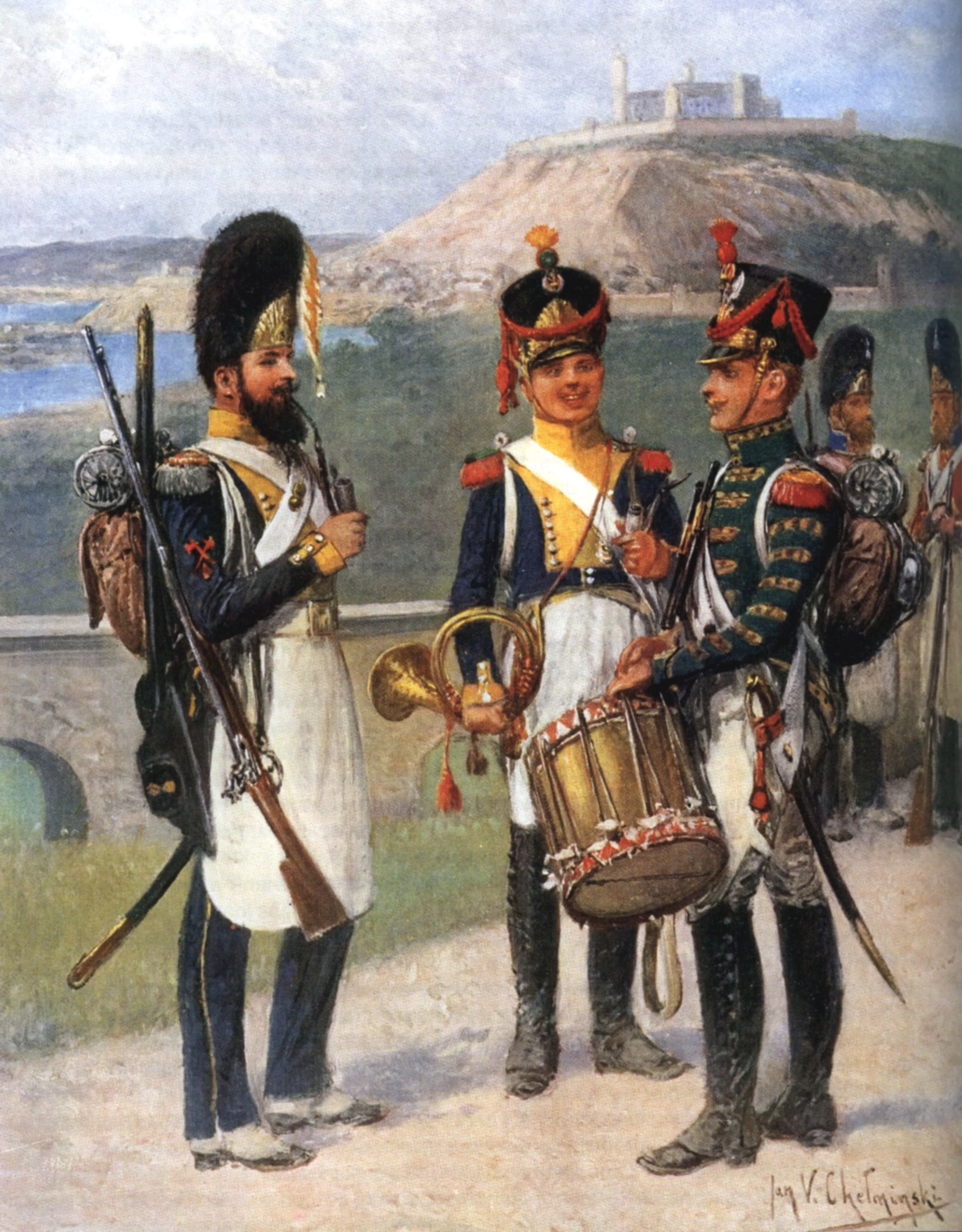
- The people in the center and on the right are a part of the 4th
- Active: 1806-1814
- Disbanded: June 13th 1814
- Country: Duchy of Warsaw
- Branch: Army of the Duchy of Warsaw
- Type: Infantry
- Garrison/HQ: Plock
- Engagements: Napoleonic Wars

The 4th Infantry Regiment (Polish: 4 Pułk Piechoty) was an infantry unit of the Army of the Duchy of Warsaw.

== History ==
The 4th Infantry Regiment was formed mainly from recruits from the Warsaw and Płock Departments in 1806. In 1808, it was stationed in Płock. After the Galician campaign, it was reinforced with a large group of recruits from the Lublin Department, as well as several hundred Poles from Galicia who had escaped Austrian service or had been taken prisoner in 1809. The regiment also included several dozen Czechs, Hungarians, Silesians, and Germans who had been captured during the 1809 wars against the Austrian Empire.

According to the 1810 establishment, the regiment consisted of a 27-man staff and three infantry battalions, each containing six companies. The battalion staffs were supposed to have four men each, while each company was to have 136 soldiers. In total, the regiment was supposed to have 2,487 soldiers. In reality, its actual strength was somewhat lower.

During preparations for the 1812 invasion of Russia, the regiment was incorporated into the structure of the 28th Division under General Girard.

While still in Germany, Napoleon ordered a new 4th Infantry Regiment to be formed from the remnants of the 4th, 7th, and 9th Infantry Regiments, under the command of Colonel Michał Cichocki. At the beginning of July 1813, it was attached to General Jan Henryk Dąbrowski's Division.

After Napoleon's abdication, Tsar Alexander I agreed to send the Polish units back to the country. They were intended to form the basis of the Polish Army under the command of Grand Duke Constantine. On June 13, 1814, the regiment was assigned a concentration area at Radom.

== Battles ==
The regiment took part in the Napoleonic wars specifically: War of the Fourth Coalition, Austro-Polish War, French invasion of Russia and War of the Sixth Coalition.

Battles and engagements:

Battle	Date
Siege of the Grudziądz fortress	May 1st 1807 to July 9th 1807
Zatory	May 25th 1807
Parsk and Nowa Wieś	June 6th 1807
Popowo	June 18th 1807
Puente del Almaraz	December 24th 1808
Ciudad Real	March 27th 1809
Talavera	July 28th 1809
Almonacid	August 11th 1809
Ocaña	November 19th 1809
Fuengirola	October 15th 1809
Monbella	December 9th 1809
Albuera	May 16th 1811
Berezina	November 26-29th 1812
Jüterbog	September 6th 1813
Leipzig	October 16-19th 1813

== Flag ==
The flag is made of crimson silk, measuring 43 × 42 cm. In the center is an embroidered Polish white eagle, with its beak and talons embroidered in gold thread, as well as a crown, scepter, and orb. Beneath the eagle is the inscription embroidered in gold: “Pułk 4” (“4th Regiment”).

The reverse side of the flag is made of blue silk. The eagle has its head turned in the opposite direction. At the bottom is the inscription embroidered in gold: “Pułk 4.” Along the edge opposite the flagstaff is a small inscription:

“Szyte ręką Zofii Potocki Żony Pierwszego Pułkownika Regimentu.”

This approximately means:

“Sewn by the hand of Zofia Potocka, wife of the regiment’s first colonel.”

The flag has silver fringe on three sides.
