= William Tisdall =

William Tisdall may refer to:

- William Tisdale (c. 1570–?), English renaissance composer
- William Tisdall (priest) (1669–1735), Irish Anglican priest and controversialist
- William St. Clair Tisdall (1859–1928), British historian and philologist
