= Edward Blayney, 1st Baron Blayney =

Welsh soldier and Irish peer

Edward Blayney, 1st Baron Blayney, also Blainey or Blaney (1570–1629) was a Welsh soldier and politician in Ireland. He became Baron Blayney of Monaghan in the Peerage of Ireland. He gave his name to the town of Castleblayney, which he founded in about 1611.

== Biography ==
He was born at Gregynog Hall in Tregynon, Montgomeryshire, a younger son of David Lloyd Blayney and his wife Elizabeth Jones. He became a soldier, saw service in Spain and the Low Countries, and came to Ireland in 1598 with Robert Devereux, 2nd Earl of Essex.

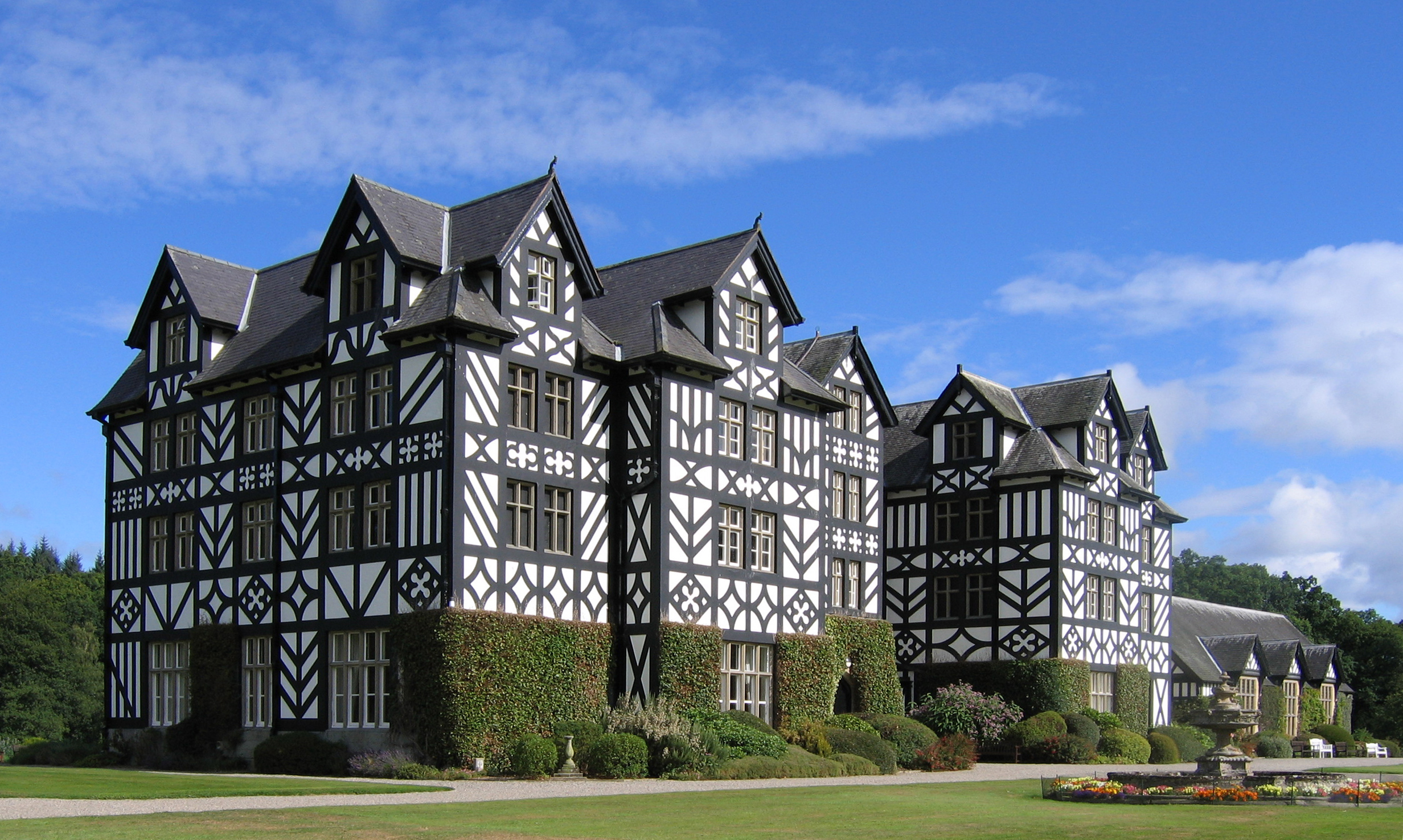
Gregynog Hall, Lord Blayney's birthplace

After Lord Mountjoy occupied Moyry Pass in 1600 and dismantled the Irish earthworks there, he marched to Mountnorris (halfway between Newry and Armagh) where he built an earthwork fort and left a garrison of 400 men under the command of Blayney, who was then a captain.

In the Parliament of 1613–15 he sat in the Irish House of Commons as MP for County Monaghan. He was sworn a member of the Privy Council of Ireland in 1615. In the 1620s he and his eldest son Henry were described as having great influence at the English Court. That he became a very wealthy man is indicated by the fact that he could afford to give his daughter Anne £1200 as her dowry for her ill-fated marriage to Lord Balfour.

As the governor of Monaghan, Blayney was granted lands at Baile na Lorgan and Muckno on the shore of Lough Muckno. He built Castle Blayney castle, around which the town of Castleblayney has grown, and was created Baron Blayney of Monaghan on 29 July 1621.

== Family ==
He married Anne, daughter of Adam Loftus, Archbishop of Dublin and Jane Purdon, as her third husband, and had eight children: Henry, Sir Arthur Blayney (High Sheriff of Montgomeryshire), Anne Lady Balfour, Mary, Martha, Elizabeth, Lettice, and Jane, who married Sir James Moore. He died on 11 February 1629. He was succeeded in the barony by his eldest son Henry Blayney, 2nd Baron Blayney, who was killed in battle in 1646.

== Anne Blayney and her husband, Lord Balfour ==
His daughter Anne when she was only 15 years old married as his third wife the aged James Balfour, 1st Baron Balfour of Glenawley. The marriage, which was "rushed though in great haste" was a disastrous failure. Balfour, having secured his wife's generous dowry, refused to honour his side of the marriage settlement, by which he had promised his wife a jointure of £300, on the ground that Anne had committed adultery. Anne under duress admitted to the adultery. The result was a lengthy and very public lawsuit, in which Lord Blayney complained that Balfour was trying to bankrupt him (although ultimately it was Balfour who was ruined). The case caused such a scandal that it was referred to the arbitration of King James I, who ordered the parties to settle their differences without further dishonour to either family: his sympathies seem to have been with Anne, as he asked why she would accuse herself of adultery, unless she had been coerced. Balfour died in 1634; Anne's date of death is uncertain.

== See also ==
- Baron Blayney

Peerage of Ireland
New creation	Baron Blayney; 1621–1629	Succeeded by Henry Blayney
