= Sohail Castle =

Castle in Fuengirola, Spain

- Castillo Sohail
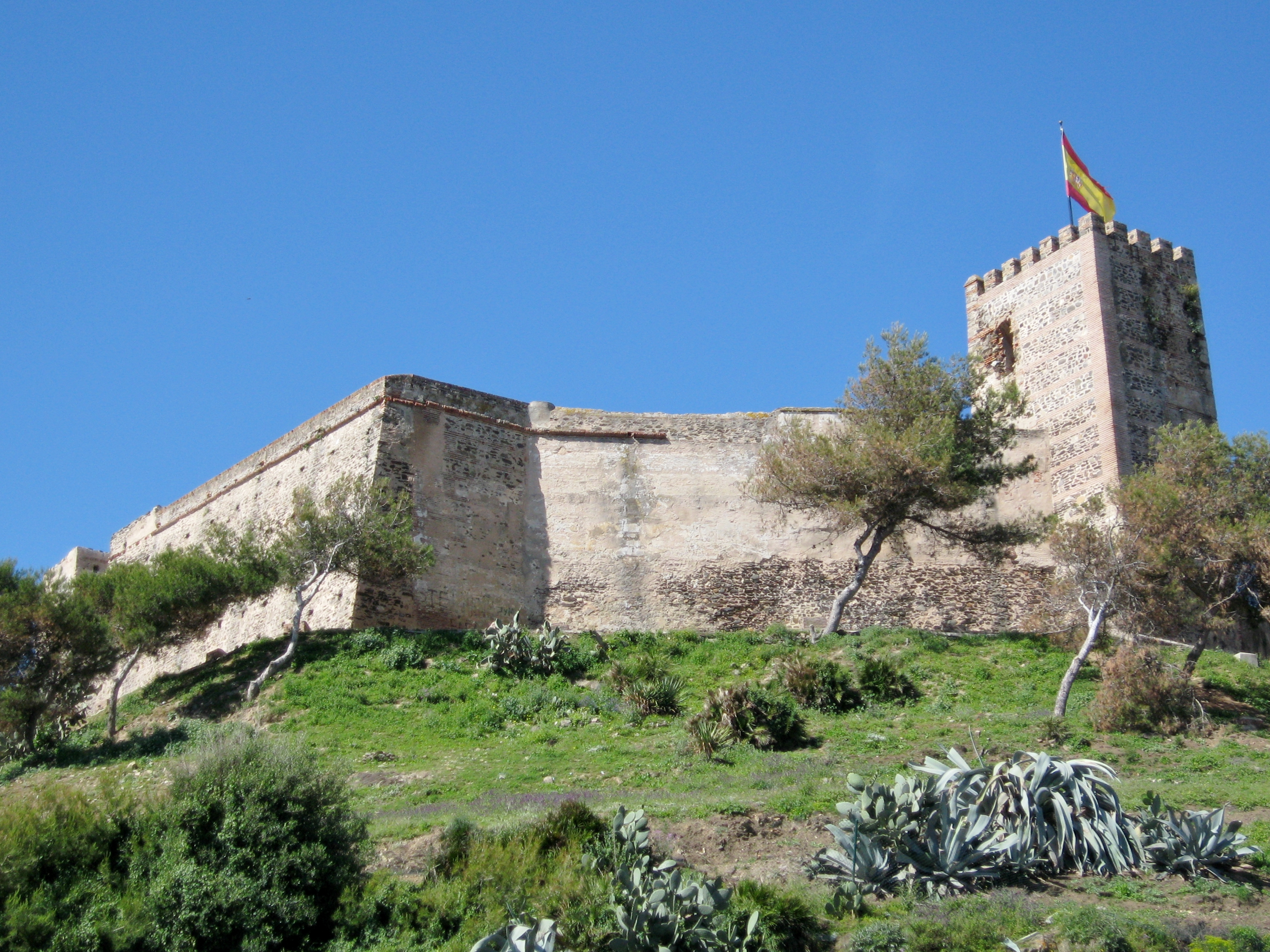
- The Sohail Castle
- Interactive map of the Sohail Castle area

General information
- Location: Fuengirola, Spain
- Coordinates: 36.525°N 4.629°W

Sohail Castle (Spanish: Castillo Sohail) is a castle in Fuengirola, Spain. It is a historic fortress located in the coastal town of Fuengirola, situated along the Costa del Sol in the province of Málaga, Andalusia, Spain. The castle sits atop a hill overlooking the Mediterranean Sea, providing a strategic vantage point for controlling the surrounding area. Throughout its history, the castle has played a significant role in various historical events, and today it is a popular tourist attraction and cultural venue in the region.

== History ==
The origins of Sohail Castle can be traced back to the Phoenician and Roman Republic settlements in the area. The current structure was primarily built during the 10th century by the Moors, who ruled the southern Iberian Peninsula at the time. Abd-ar-Rahman III ordered to build a little citadel here in 956 to strengthen the coastal defenses. The castle played an essential role in the defense of the area during the Muslim rule, known as Al-Andalus, and witnessed multiple battles and sieges throughout its history.

After the Christian Reconquista in the late 15th century, the castle was taken over by the Catholic Monarchs and became an essential part of the Spanish coastal defenses. In the 18th century, the castle was partially destroyed during the War of Spanish Succession. It was subsequently rebuilt and further fortified in the 19th century to defend against French invasion during the Peninsular War. The castle was finally decommissioned in the early 20th century and fell into disrepair.

== Architecture ==
Sohail Castle is characterized by its robust, square-plan design, with four corner towers connected by curtain walls. The castle is made primarily of limestone and features a combination of Moorish and Christian architectural elements. Notable features include the keep (the central, tallest tower), which was used as a watchtower and refuge during sieges, and the double defensive walls that surround the structure.

The main entrance to the castle is through a horseshoe-shaped archway, a distinctive feature of Islamic architecture. Inside the castle, visitors can explore various chambers, rooms, and courtyards that once served various purposes, such as living quarters, storage areas, and defensive positions.

== Restoration and Modern Use ==
In the late 20th century, the local government of Fuengirola undertook a comprehensive restoration project to preserve and revitalize Sohail Castle. The restoration work aimed to respect the historical significance of the site while adapting it for modern use.

Today, Sohail Castle serves as a cultural venue and hosts various events, such as concerts (like Marenostrum Fuengirola), theater performances, and art exhibitions. The castle's unique setting and stunning views of the Mediterranean Sea make it a popular tourist attraction and an essential part of Fuengirola's cultural heritage.

== Visiting the Castle ==
Sohail Castle is open to the public year-round, with extended hours during the summer months. Guided tours are available, providing insights into the castle's history and architectural features. Visitors can also explore the castle at their own pace using informational panels placed throughout the site.

In addition to the castle itself, there is a visitor center located at the base of the hill, which houses a small museum, a gift shop, and a café. The surrounding park area offers picturesque walking paths, picnic areas, and panoramic views of the coastline.

There is a bus stop near the parking lot beside the castle operated by the Avanza bus line, Route M-220.

== See also ==
- Battle of Fuengirola
- Mare Nostrum Fuengirola
