= Hope Castle =

Historic house in County Monaghan, Ireland

Coordinates: 54.119°N 6.730°W

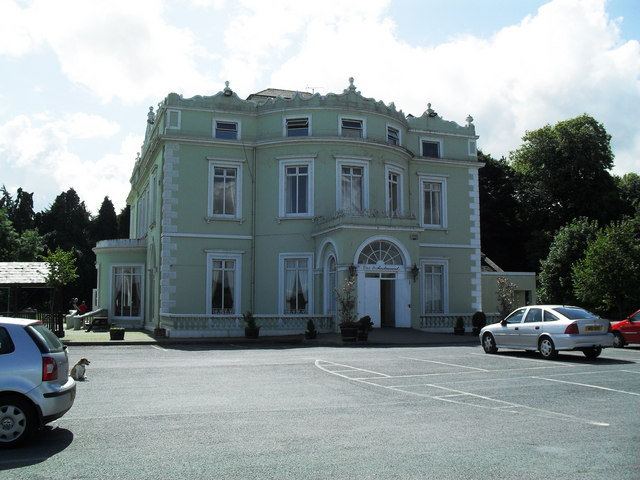
- Interactive map of the Hope Castle area
- Former names: Blayney Castle (Until 1853)

General information
- Type: House
- Architectural style: Georgian (1799), later Victorian embellishments
- Location: County Monaghan, Castleblayney, Ireland
- Groundbreaking: 1795
- Completed: 1799

Technical details
- Floor count: 3

Design and construction
- Architect: Robert Woodgate
- Developer: The 11th Baron Blayney

Hope Castle is a historic house and demesne in Castleblayney, County Monaghan, Ireland. Originally a private home, over the course of the 20th century, Hope Castle was used as a military barracks, a hospital, convent, and was most recently used as a hotel before it was damaged by a fire in 2010.

== History ==
=== Blayney ownership ===
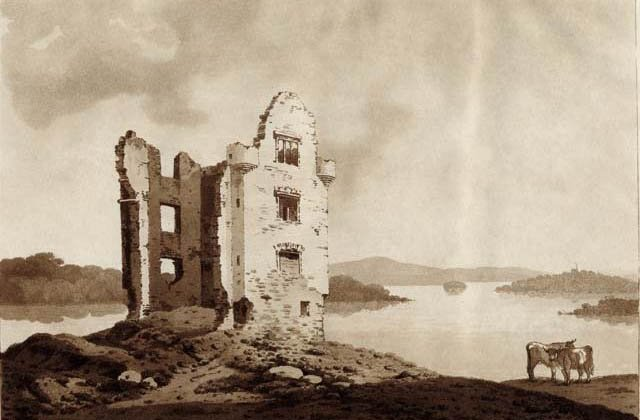
Blayney Castle, Castleblayney, Co. Monaghan

The land on which the house was built was originally owned by Sir Edward Blayney (1570–1629), to whom it was granted in 1607. Blayney was a Welsh soldier from Montgomeryshire who was granted land at Ballynalurgan and Muckno, where he built a stone defensive castle, Blayney Castle. The town of Castleblayney grew up round that original site. Blayney was created the first Baron Blayney in 1621 and the Blayneys would continue to occupy the estate until after the 1830s. In the time of the second baron, in 1641, the castle was captured by rebels fighting under Hugh Mac Patrick Dubh MacMahon. The baron escaped but his wife and children were captured.

The 7th Baron Blayney sold off part of the land in 1723. It was not until the 1780s that the present building, originally named Blayney Castle, was constructed near the old Elizabethan castle for the 11th Baron Blayney (1770–1834), a soldier who owned the land from 1784 to 1834.

=== Hope ownership ===
In 1853, Cadwallader, 12th Baron Blayney, sold the entire Blayney estate to the wealthy Henry Thomas Hope, who substantially renovated the building. The 12th Baron Blayney was the last Lord Blayney. It was only under the ownership of the Hope family, the Scottish-Dutch banking family that is famous for their ownership of the Hope Diamond, that the building got its new name of Hope Castle, one which it still holds today. Henrietta Adela Hope, daughter of Henry Thomas Hope, who married an English duke, later inherited the estate. Her husband was the 6th Duke of Newcastle, who held the courtesy title of Earl of Lincoln at the time of their marriage (1861) and later succeeded his father as the 6th Duke of Newcastle-under-Lyne. From 1900 to 1904, Hope Castle served as a home for Prince Arthur, 1st Duke of Connaught and Strathearn, Queen Victoria's son, and his family. The duke was the commander of the British Forces in Ireland at that time.

=== 20th century use ===
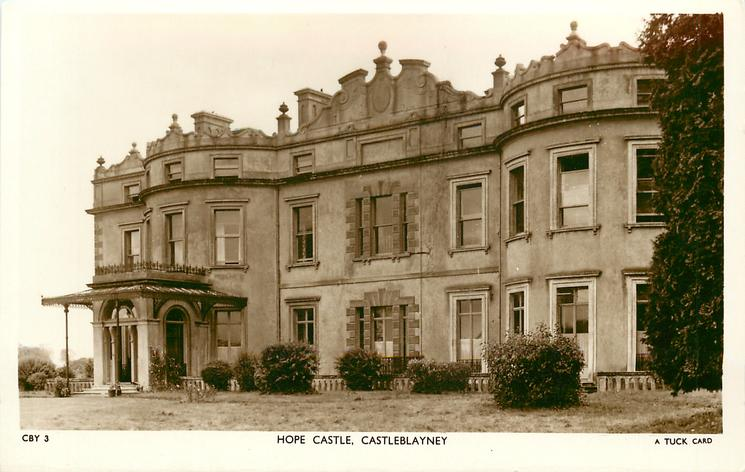
Early 20th-century photograph of the house

The Hope family left the estate in 1916, leaving it to serve as a military barracks during the War of Independence between the years 1919 and 1921. It later became the site of Monaghan County Hospital for the short time between 1932 and 1937. Beginning in 1942, Hope Castle served as a Franciscan Order Convent until the early 1970s.

After its many years serving as a local convent, Hope Castle was owned privately until Monaghan County Council acquired it in the 1980s. The County Council leased the building to several people, including the most recent local businessman, Chris Haren, who was leasing the property when it was extensively damaged in an arson attack in November 2010. Up until the fire, Hope Castle was being run as a small hotel, containing bar lounges, a restaurant, and several guest rooms.

=== 2010 fire ===
In November 2010, the building was subject to an arson attack that left the hotel building with extensive interior damages. In a very short amount of time the fire spread through the bar and lounge areas, up the stairwells, and into the upstairs rooms. The building was uninhabited at the time of the fire; However, the contents of the hotel including a considerable amount of the fittings, furniture, and antiques were destroyed. At the time of the incident, it was clear to local Gardaí that entry was gained by trespassers to the ground floor of the building where the fire was started. It is believed that a local group of teenagers forced entry to the building and intentionally started the fire. Although Gardaí questioned juveniles in the town, no persons were ever convicted of the crime.

== House and demesne ==
Lieutenant-General The 11th Baron Blayney originally built the current house in the 1780s. It was later redesigned in a Georgian style by architect Robert Woodgate in the year 1799.

The house is a three-story, five bay house located near the site of an earlier plantation, which was restored during the Victorian era. Some of the Victorian era embellishments include cresting on the roof parapets and on the entrance to the building, which has a central curved bow. A glass projection porch and canopy of ornamental iron cast were also added to the structure.

In 1832, the landscape architect William Sawrey Gilpin was employed by Baron Blayney to make improvements to the Blayney demesne.

The gate lodges, stables, and bath houses are still extant while the ironwork for these structures was carried out by father and son James and Alexander Shekleton in 1862 for Anne Adèle (née Bichat), widow of Henry Thomas Hope. The updated stable yards seem to have been constructed slightly after around 1865.

When it was taken over by the local County Council, the building was renovated and the 19th century additions to the gardens and main front were demolished. Hope Castle is surrounded by grounds of green land next to a forest area accompanied by a large lake, known as the Black Island. The building, although not currently in use, consists of several bedrooms, a bar lounge and restaurant area.
