= Battle of Fuengirola =

1810 battle during the Peninsular War

- Part of the Peninsular War
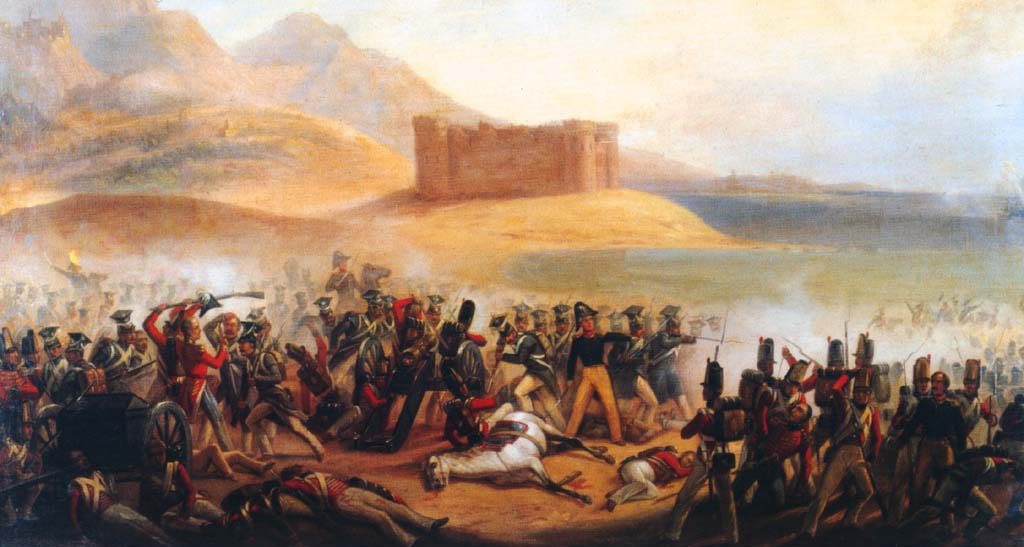
- A painting of the battle by January Suchodolski
Date	15 October 1810
Location	near Fuengirola, Spain 36°32′30″N 4°37′30″W
Result	Franco-Polish victory

Belligerents
Duchy of Warsaw; France	United Kingdom; Spain

Commanders and leaders
Franciszek Młokosiewicz; Ignacy Bronisz^{[pl]}	(United Kingdom of Great Britain and Ireland) Lord Blayney (POW)

Strength
400 (Warsaw); 57 (France) (Note: The Franco-Polish number will be less if Bronisz is not taken into account.)	1,000 (United Kingdom); 1,500 (Spain); 2 ships of the line 2 frigates 5 gunboats Several brigs and sloops

Casualties and losses
20 killed 100 wounded	65 killed 70 wounded 200 captured 5 cannon captured 1 gunboat sunk the previous day

Peninsular War: Siege of Cádiz
current battle

The Battle of Fuengirola was a field military engagement of the Peninsular War fought on 15 October 1810 near Fuengirola between the 457-strong Franco-Polish garrisons (mainly infantry) of the Sohail Castle and the town of Alhaurín el Grande, under Franciszek Młokosiewicz and Ignacy Bronisz's command respectively, and a much larger Anglo-Spanish field force of approx. 2,500 men led by Andrew Blayney, 11th Baron Blayney. In this battle, which was a sortie from the castle and the town, the Anglo-allies were routed. (Note: See § External links, Nafziger, pp. 104–109, Chandler, p. 163)

On 14 October, Blayney's troops conducted an amphibious assault under the cover of an offshore artillery bombardment against the garrison of Sohail Castle, which consisted of 161 troops from the army of the Duchy of Warsaw and the French Imperial Army. At this point, Blayney had 1,700 men; reinforcements were landed on the 15th. The defenders ultimately managed to frustrate the attacking forces' attempts to capture the castle. 60 Polish infantry reinforcements from the town of Mijas approached Młokosiewicz before he led a joint Franco-Polish assault on 15 October, which captured Blayney and forced his men to re-embark in disarray. Bronisz managed to carry out a diversionary attack within the battle. The British and Spanish suffered 335 men killed, wounded or captured while the Franco-Polish defenders suffered 120 casualties. Several of the Polish officers involved in the battle were subsequently awarded the Legion of Honour by Napoleon.

== Background ==
The Spanish town of Fuengirola has been an important centre of trade since the Middle Ages. To defend it against a seaborne invasion, the Moors constructed Sohail Castle on a hill between the Mediterranean and the Fuengirola River. During the Peninsular War, the Costa del Sol area Fuengirola was located in was considered of secondary importance by both sides, being occupied by the French Imperial Army with little opposition. Until 1810, there was little Spanish guerrilla activity in the region. As such, after suffering losses in the Spanish interior, a number of units of the army of the Duchy of Warsaw were sent there in October 1810 to serve as a garrison and to rest.

After they arrived, Sohail Castle was manned by 150 Polish soldiers from the 4th Infantry Regiment and 11 French dragoons. The Poles were led by Captain Franciszek Młokosiewicz. A number of similar detachments were garrisoned in the nearby towns of Mijas (where 60 infantrymen under Lieutenant Eustachy Chełmicki were stationed) and Alhaurin (where 200 infantrymen and 40 dragoons under Major Ignacy Bronisz^{[pl]} were stationed). All three detachments were part of the IV Corps under the command of Horace François Bastien Sébastiani de La Porta, who was stationed at Málaga. The IV Corps numbered roughly 10,000 men and were stationed in southern Andalusia to prevent local Spanish guerrillas from receiving supplies from Gibraltar.

In the autumn of 1810, Major-General Andrew Blayney, 11th Baron Blayney decided to lead an expeditionary force from Gibraltar towards Málaga and seize it in a surprise attack, with the beaches near Sohail Castle appearing to be a perfect landing place for his forces. Spanish guerrillas had informed the British about the weakness of the castle's garrison and their lack of reserves. In October 1810, Blayney gathered a field force consisting of the 2/89th Regiment of Foot, a battalion of French deserters, a Royal Artillery unit, Royal Navy gun crews and the Spanish Army's Toledo Regiment. This force numbered approximately 1,700 men, excluding Royal Navy personnel. They boarded a small fleet consisting of two frigates, (HMS Topaze and HMS Sparrowhawk), five gunboats, several brigs and transport sloops.

== Battle ==
On 14 October 1810, Blayney's field force reached Cala Moral Bay, about two miles southwest from Fuengirola. His infantry disembarked, and were joined on the beach by a small number of Spanish guerrillas. Blayney led his force northeast along the shore while his fleet sailed parallel toward Fuengirola. At 2:00 pm they arrived in front of Sohail Castle and Blayney sent an emissary to convince Młokosiewicz to surrender. Młokosiewicz refused, and in response the British fleet offshore initiated a naval bombardment of the castle.

Despite their numerical inferiority, the Polish garrison in Sohail Castle continued to hold out and even returned fire using two cannon, sinking a British gunboat and leading the other gunboats to withdraw out of range. Under the cover of artillery fire from Topaze and Sparrowhawk, Blayney ordered a frontal attack on the castle walls. However, after Major Grant, the commander of 2/89th Regiment of Foot, was killed in action, Blayney ordered a general retreat. Under the cover of night, he landed his guns and British engineers constructed two artillery emplacements near Sohail Castle, which they planned to use to destroy the walls. In the meantime, the Polish garrison at Mijas, alerted by the artillery bombardment, snuck through British lines and joined up with the castle's defenders. The garrison at Alhaurin was also alerted and in the morning of 15 October marched to Mijas, where it clashed with a 450-strong force of Spanish and German troops sent there by Blayney, dispersing it with a bayonet charge.

On the morning of 15 October, the British artillery bombardment intensified and destroyed one of Sohail Castle's towers. Around 2:00 pm, HMS Rodney and a Spanish Navy ship of the line arrived at Fuengirola, bringing 932 men of the 1/82nd Regiment of Foot. To counter these new arrivals, Młokosiewicz decided to carry out a surprise attack on the British artillery positions. Leaving the castle guarded mostly by wounded soldiers, he led 130 soldiers in a sally, taking the besiegers by surprise. Despite their numerical superiority, Spanish troops protecting the British artillery positions retreated in disorder. After capturing the guns, the Poles turned them away from the castle and started shelling the British. Although their artillery fire mostly missed its targets, as there were no trained artillery officers among the Poles, it made the regrouping of nearby British troops much more difficult.

After about half an hour, Blayney managed to reorganise his troops on the beach and ordered an assault against the artillery positions occupied by Polish troops. The outnumbered defenders blew up the gunpowder supplies of their guns and withdrew towards the castle. However, before Blayney's forces could push any further, they were attacked on their left flank by the 200-strong Polish garrison at Alhaurin that had just arrived on the battlefield. They distracted the attackers long enough to let Młokosiewicz regroup his withdrawing force and strike the right flank of the British line. This near-simultaneous attack, supported by approximately 30 French cavalrymen from the 21st Dragoon Regiment, surprised the British. After Blayney was taken prisoner by the Poles, his subordinates sounded the retreat and started a re-embarcation under fire from the Polish troops using the captured artillery.

== Aftermath ==
The British and Spanish had suffered 335 men killed, wounded or captured plus 5 cannon captured while the Franco-Polish defenders suffered 20 killed and 100 wounded. Other estimates give down to 290–310 Coalition casualties only among the British. Several of the Polish officers involved in the battle were subsequently awarded the Legion of Honour by Napoleon. The battle, along with the battles of Maida and Albuera, was one of the few instances during the French Revolutionary and Napoleonic Wars where British and Polish troops fought against each other.

In his memoirs, Blayney downplayed the importance of the battle and claimed he had been captured by a member of the Society of United Irishmen instead of Poles. He remained in captivity for four years, and his captured sabre is currently on display at the Czartoryski Museum in Kraków. Some British military historians claimed that the battle was decided by the timely arrival of a French relief force under Sébastiani's command from Málaga. However, Sébastiani's own report to Jean-de-Dieu Soult attests that his column reached Fuengirola on the morning of 16 October, some time after the fight.
