= Fuengirola =

City in Andalusia, Spain

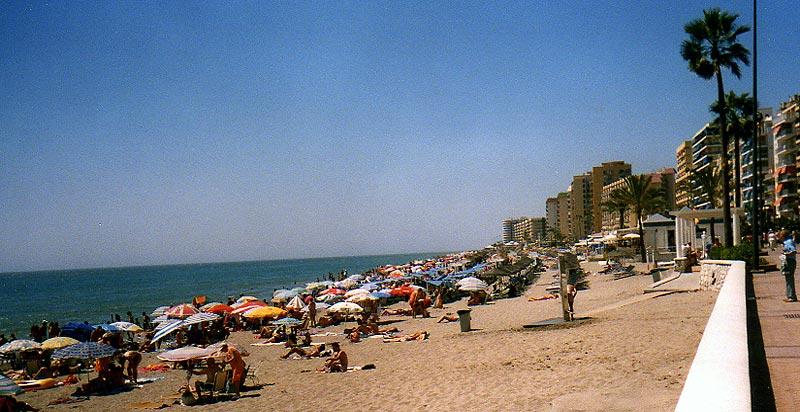

- Flag Coat of arms

- Location of Fuengirola in Málaga province

- Location in Andalusia
- Coordinates: 36°32′30″N 4°37′30″W
- Country: Spain
- Autonomous community: Andalusia
- Province: Málaga

Government
  - Mayor: Ana Mula (PP)

Area
  - Total: 10.31 km^{2} (3.98 sq mi)
- Elevation: 6 m (20 ft)

Population (2025)
  - Total: 84,857
  - Density: 8,231/km^{2} (21,320/sq mi)
- Demonym: Fuengiroleños
- Time zone: UTC+1 (CET)
  - Summer (DST): UTC+2 (CEST)
- Website: Official website

Fuengirola (pronounced [fweŋxiˈɾola]) is a city on the Costa del Sol in the province of Málaga in the autonomous community of Andalusia in southern Spain. It is located on the central coast of the province and integrated into the region of the Costa del Sol and the Commonwealth of Municipalities of the Costa del Sol Occidental. It has 84,857 inhabitants.

The city is largely urban in character, with many high-rise apartment blocks, particularly near the seafront. There are some narrow streets with many low-rise villas. Considerable commercial and housing development is underway further inland.

It is a major tourist resort, with more than 8 km (5 mi) of beaches and a medieval Moorish fortress. In common with much of this coast, it has been the subject of considerable urban development.

In the summer months, the town is visited by large numbers of holidaymakers from Spain and abroad, amongst whom are many from the UK and Scandinavia. The English-speaking community in particular is large enough to support a fully developed programme of activities and local groups.

The area has a subtropical Mediterranean climate, with annual average temperatures of 18 °C (65 °F) and average summer temperatures of over 30 °C (86 °F).

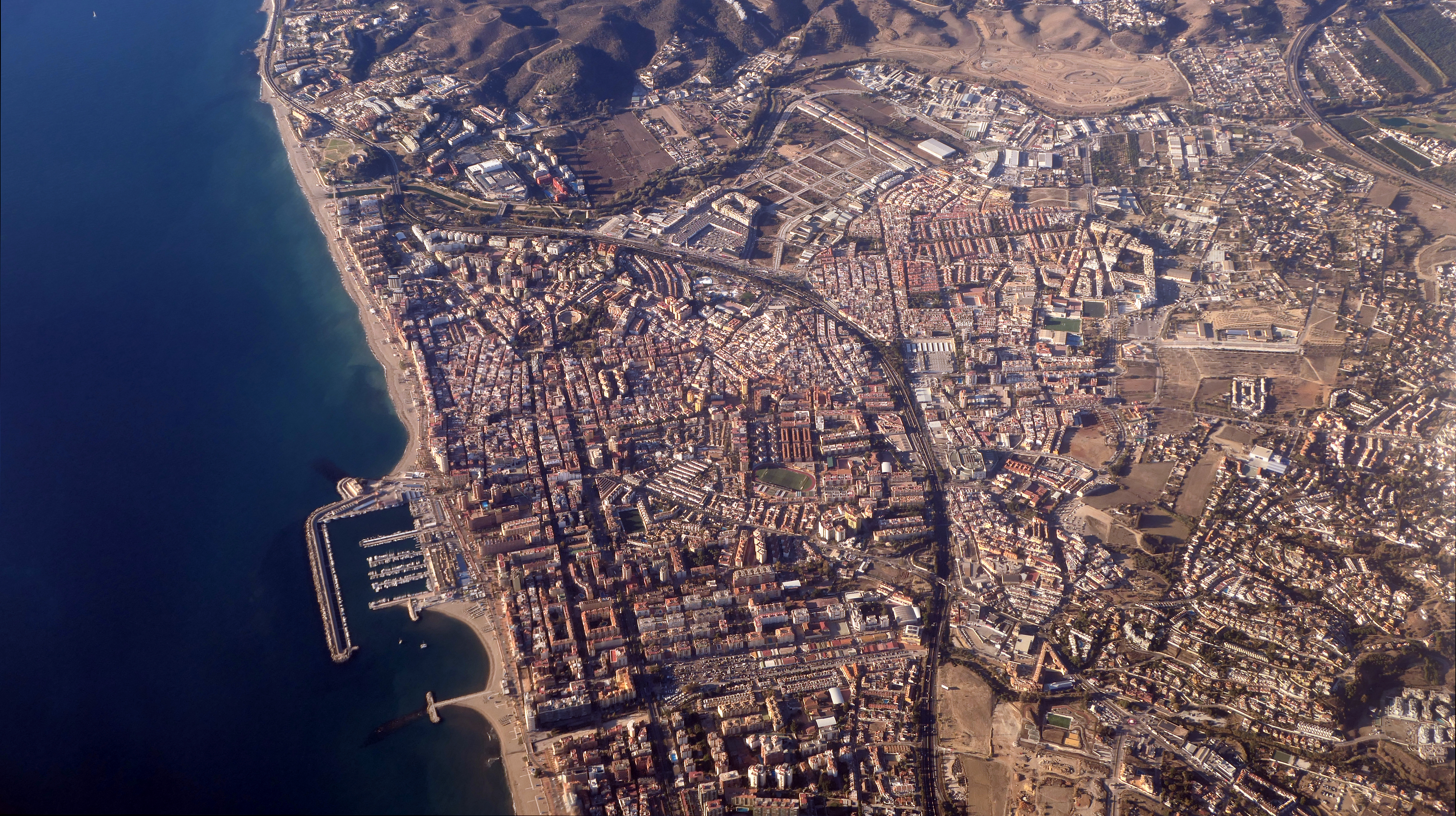
An aerial view of Fuengirola

== History ==
The town has its origins in Phoenician, Roman, and Moorish civilisations.

The foothills of the mountain range behind the town to the south are the site of Sohail Castle, which contains remains of an early Phoenician settlement, later occupied by the Romans, which became a town known in antiquity as Suel. Suel was identified by the Roman historian Pomponius Mela as one of the towns of the coast, and was cited by Pliny in the 1st century AD as a fortified town or oppidum. A later historian, Ptolemy, identified it during the 2nd century as being located in the region of the bastulo-penos or Phoenicians.

The inscription on the pedestal of a statue found near the castle mentions Suel as being a Roman "municipium". A funeral urn found in the same area has an inscription containing the word "Suelitana". Roman baths were discovered in 1961 and, close by, the remains of a Roman villa containing two sculptures, one of which is known as the "Venus of Fuengirola", exhibited in the town's museum. A series of architectural components, probably transported from the Mijas quarry during the Roman era, were discovered in Los Boliches in 1984; these have now been mounted to form a temple entrance, and are on the promenade at Los Boliches.

Sohail Castle

The castle was built by Abd-ar-Rahman III in the mid-10th century. The city of Suel ceased to be mentioned at the beginning of the Middle Ages. After several centuries, the name of the settlement changed from Suel to Suhayl, which became the name of the castle and surroundings during the Moorish era. Suhayl became a fairly large settlement, which included farmland and small villages. Most of the surrounding area seems to have been used as pasture for the Moorish rulers' camels. Writer and scholar Abdul Rahman bin Abdullah bin Ahmed (known as Al-Allama Abdul Qasim Al-suhayli) Al-Suhayli ("the man from Suhayl") lived there from 1130 to 1203, and later became known as one of the seven saints of Marrakesh, where he was buried.

In the early Middle Ages the town was set on fire and its inhabitants fled to Mijas. Suhayl became a mound of ruins, and even its name was changed to the Romanised Font-Jirola, after the spring arising at the foot of the castle, according to historian Alonso de Palencia.

In 1485, when only the fortress remained, the settlement, along with the rest of the Kingdom of Granada, fell into the hands of the Christian Monarchs in the final phase of the Reconquista (reconquest). An attempt to repopulate the site with 30 people failed, and in 1511 it was registered as uninhabited, apart from the fortress and a watchtower. Land originally set aside for Fuengirola was reallocated to Mijas.

In the 17th century, once the threat from Turkish and Moroccan pirates had disappeared, a new urban settlement developed; at the beginning of the 18th century, an inn was opened near the beach, offering accommodation to travellers, muleteers and seafarers. A few huts were built nearby, forming a small village.

The Battle of Fuengirola took place in the area during the Peninsular War, on October 15, 1810, when approximately 400 Polish soldiers of the Duchy of Warsaw defeated a mixed British-Spanish force numbering some 4,000 soldiers under Lord Blayney.

In May 1841, Fuengirola was administratively detached from Mijas; at the time its inhabitants were mainly engaged in fishing, agriculture and trading with ships that dropped anchor in the bay. For over a century, fishing and agriculture remained the main activities.

In the 1960s Fuengirola started to become a leading tourist centre, eventually having the expected facilities for eating, sleeping, and entertainment. The town has broad beaches along a promenade extending east and west from the town, that includes smaller adjacent villages.

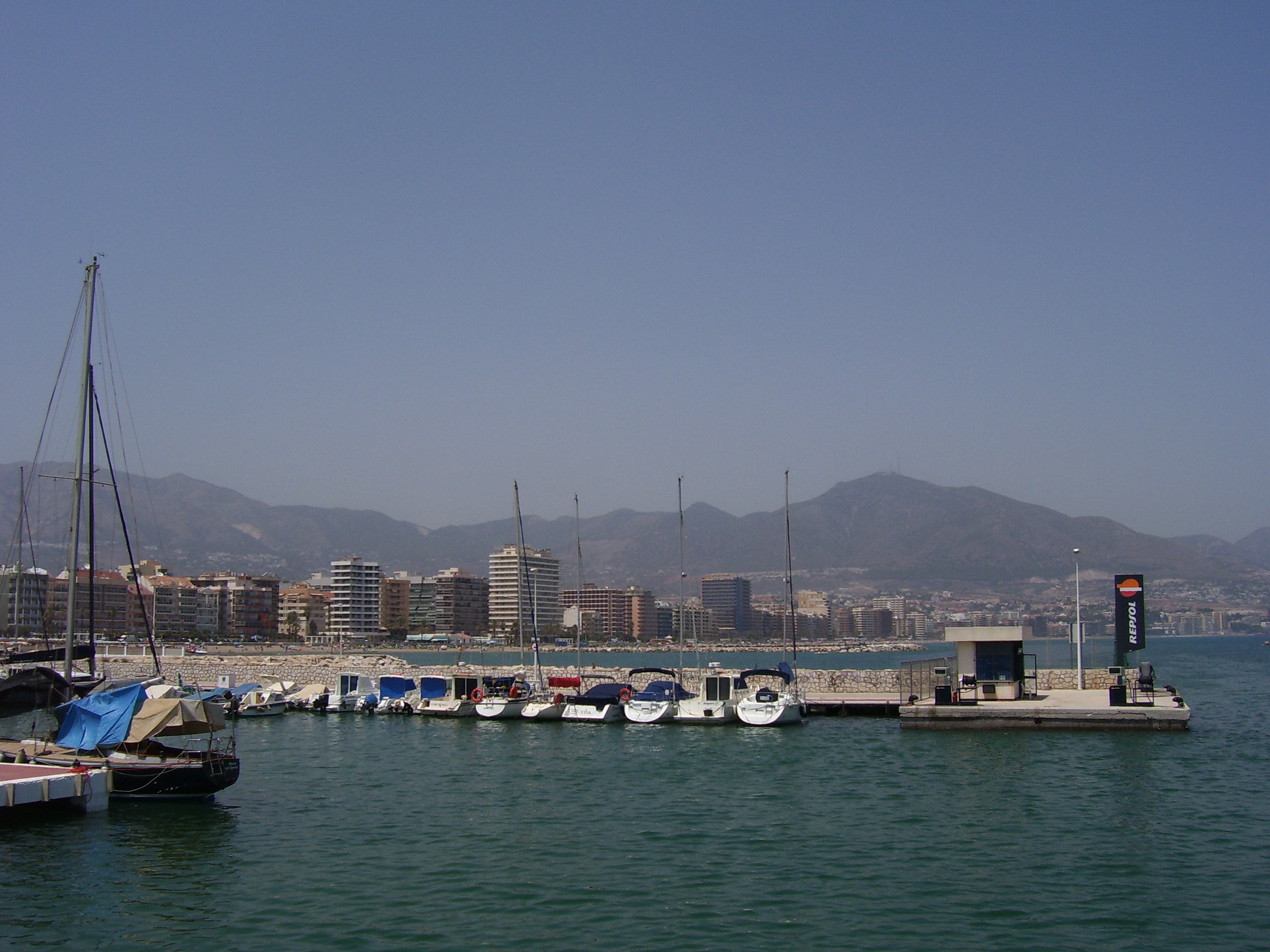
Fuengirola harbour

== Suburbs ==
- Los Boliches (in full: Santa Fe de los Boliches)
- Torreblanca
- Carvajal
- El Boquetillo
- Los Pacos

== Demographics ==
Historical population
Year	Pop.	±%
1842	1,182	—
1857	2,373	+100.8%
1877	4,306	+81.5%
1887	4,747	+10.2%
1900	5,966	+25.7%
1910	6,306	+5.7%
1920	6,350	+0.7%
1930	6,829	+7.5%
1940	6,865	+0.5%
1950	6,774	−1.3%
1960	8,589	+26.8%
1970	17,908	+108.5%
1981	29,160	+62.8%
1991	37,742	+29.4%
2001	49,675	+31.6%
2011	72,019	+45.0%
2021	81,987	+13.8%
Source: INE

As of 2025, the population is 84,857, of which 48.2% are males, and 51.8% are females. Minors make up 14.9% of the population, and seniors make up 24.1%.

=== Immigration ===
As of 2025, immigrants make up 44.4% of the population. The 5 largest foreign countries of birth are Finland, Morocco, the United Kingdom, Argentina, and Sweden.

Foreign population by country of birth (2025)
Country	Population
Finland	4,423
Morocco	4,160
United Kingdom	4,152
Argentina	3,844
Sweden	1,954
Colombia	1,745
Ukraine	1,352
Venezuela	1,112
Denmark	925
Paraguay	914
Italy	750
France	697
Russia	627
China	600
Norway	566

== Sights ==
Fuengirola has a number of historical sites and open parks. The old port is still used by local Spanish fishermen. Sohail Castle remained an abandoned ruin until renovations began in 1995. In 2000, the interior of the castle was completely renovated and it began to host festivals and concerts throughout the summer. Additional landscaping was completed in 2002.

Bioparc Fuengirola is a zoo that specializes in captive breeding for endangered species, research on chimpanzee groups and in tropical forest education. It has a series of natural habitats for different species.

- Sohail Castle (Moorish castle)
- Harbour
- Fuengirola Bullring
- Bioparc Fuengirola (zoo)
- Fuengirola museum
- Roman ruins
- TSD (Mijas)

== Culture ==
=== Cultural events ===
Most cultural activities in Fuengirola take place during the summer. In June, the festival of music and dance is celebrated in the Sohail castle. In this same place is also organized the Medieval market, the Festival of the town of Fuengirola and the Beer Party. Other noteworthy events are: the Cinema Festival of Fuengirola, The International Faire and the International Faire of the Villages, the last two being celebrated between the last days of April and the first days of May, and the International Festival of Latin Rhythms in September. There is a second hand street market every Saturday in the premises of the faire. It is a very famous market in the Costa del Sol where almost any object can be found. On Sundays there is also another market in the Doña Sofía park.

=== Cultural amenities ===
- History museum: is the only museum of the town, inaugurated in 2003. It has a collection of remains which are mostly part of the Cerro de Suel field, the castle and the house of the secretary. It is located in the old house of the Official veterinary surgeon, in the Spain Square. The exhibition is organized in two sections: one focused on the old history, made up of Phoenician, Roman and Moorish pieces. The other is based on ethnographic contents such as traditional fishing and crafts...
- Open museum: a project launched in 1988, it is part of the large walls displayed in the façade of diverse buildings of the town. Among others, these painters' works are exhibited: Manuel Barbadillo, Joaquín Peinado, Enrique Brinkmann, Escalona y José María Córdoba.
- Peace Palace: a multi-purpose space for theatrical performances and musical shows, exhibitions and speeches.
- Salon Varietés Theatre: a small theatre that offers an exclusive program in English. It is the only one in Andalucia that is managed by foreign residents.
- The Culture House: it contains an exhibition room and a function room with a capacity to hold 165 people. It is a venue for conferences, concerts, theaters, recitals, etc.
- The Fuengirola Bullring has various activities besides bullfights.
- Fuengirola has 3 municipal libraries: the Central library named for Miguel de Cervantes, another named after the writer Francisco Quevedo in the Boliches district and the Lope de Vega Library in the neighbourhood of El Boquetillo; and a fourth state-owned one, situated in the old Oceanographic center of Malaga, at the harbor, specializing in geological studies of the Mediterranean coast, marine biology, sea pollution and other marine issues.

== Shopping ==
Miramar, a shopping and leisure complex, which opened in early 2004 (and was restyled in 2013) and is situated on the west side of Fuengirola, with direct access to the A-7 motorway. It has an area of 119,000 m^{2}, making it one of the Costa del Sol's largest retail areas and is home to national and international retailers, in the fields of fashion, accessories, decoration and services as well as a 12-screen multi-cinema complex and many cafes and restaurants.

== Transport ==
Cities on the coast are accessible by bus from Fuengirola, including Málaga, Estepona, Torremolinos, Marbella, Benalmádena and Gibraltar. The area is also served by the A7 motorway; the closest airport is Málaga-Costa Del Sol.

=== Rail ===
Fuengirola is the end of the C-1 commuter rail service from central Málaga, run by Cercanías Málaga. There are two train stations within city lines, Fuengirola and Los Boliches. The C-1 line connects some of the intervening villages along the coast and Malaga/ Costa del Sol Airport.

The railway station is located centre of the city on Paseo Jesús Santos Rein, 5, within 50m from the bus station.

== International relations ==
=== Twin towns – sister cities ===
- New Iberia, United States

== See also ==
- List of municipalities in Málaga
