= Fuengirola Bullring =

Bullring and cultural center in Fuengirola, Spain

- Plaza de Toros de Fuengirola
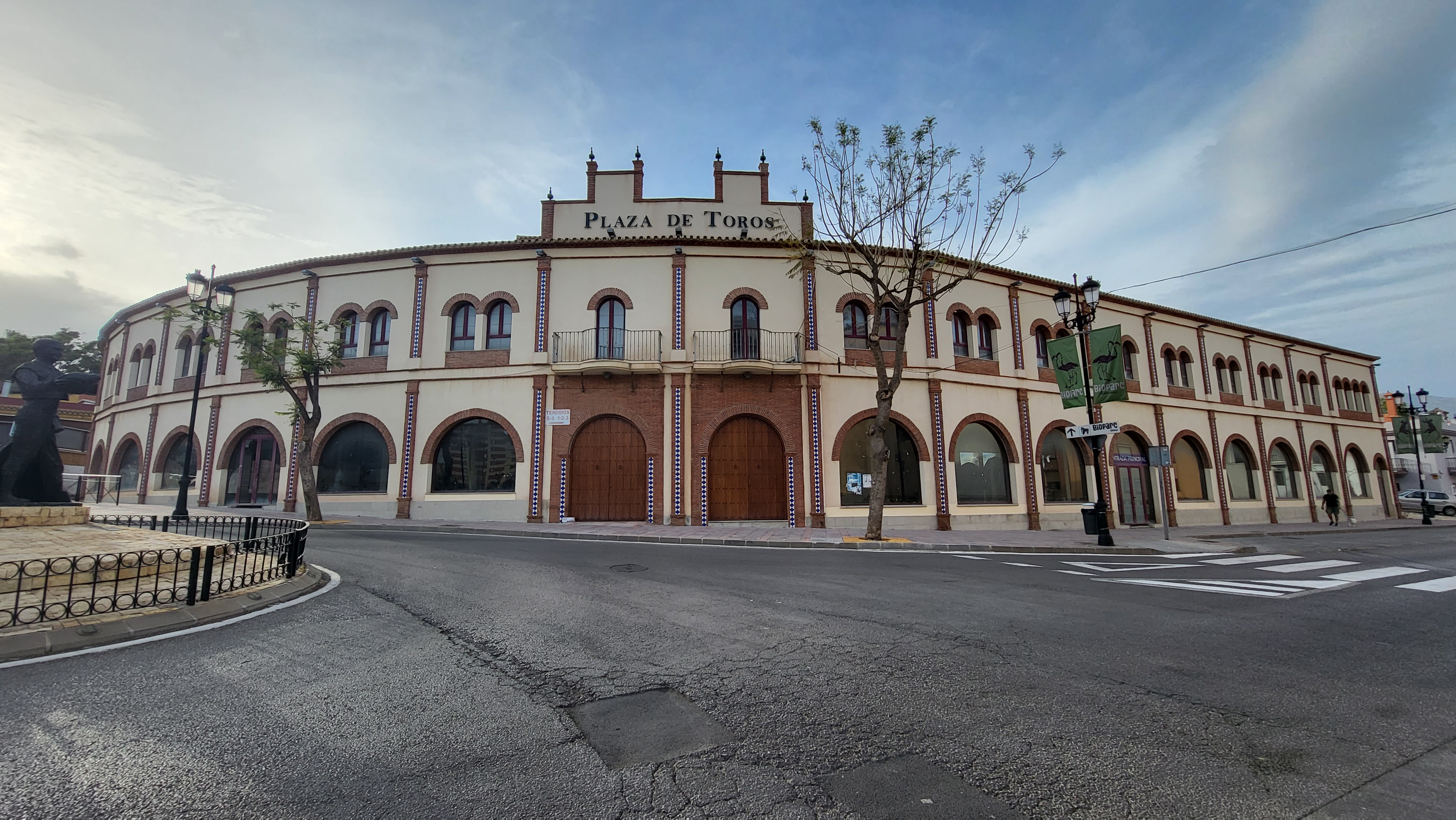
- Fuengirola Bullring
- Interactive map of Fuengirola Bullring
- Address: Calle Camilo José Cela, 12, 29640 Fuengirola, Málaga
- Location: Fuengirola, Spain
- Coordinates: 36.53647760711426°N 4.628470976293797°W

Construction
- Opened: July 8, 1962; 64 years ago
- Renovated: 2012, 2025

Website
- plazadetorosfuengirola.com
- Location within Spain

History
- Built: 1962

Spanish Cultural Heritage
- Official name: Plaza de Toros de Fuengirola
- Type: Non-movable
- Criteria: Monument

Fuengirola Bullring (Plaza de Toros de Fuengirola (Spanish)) is a 3rd category bullring and cultural center located in Fuengirola, a coastal town in the province of Málaga, part of the autonomous community of Andalusia, Spain. Originally built for bullfighting, it has been repurposed as a cultural center.

== History ==
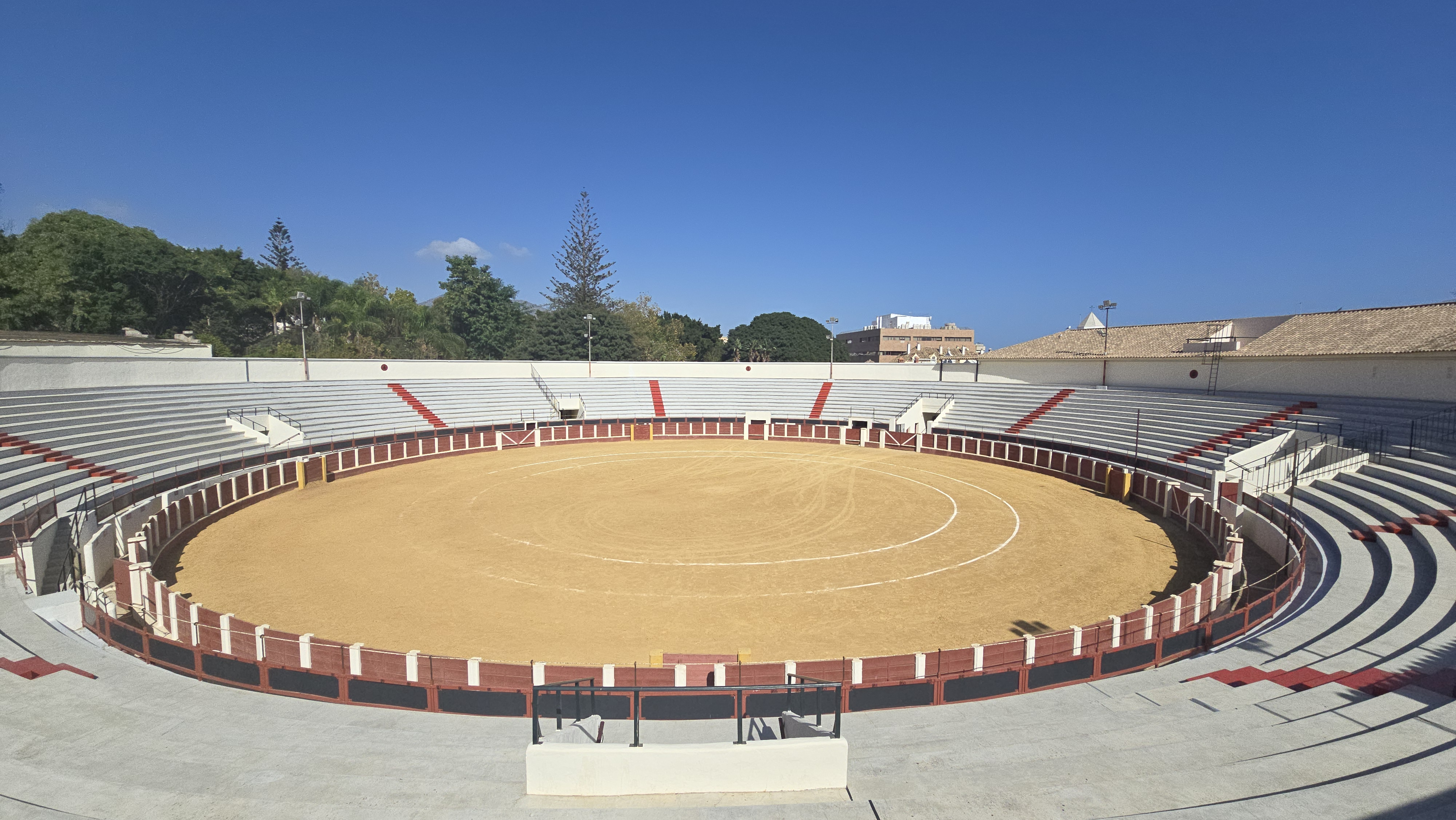
View of the arena on October 13th 2025

The Fuengirola Bullring was inaugurated on 8 July 1962, featuring bullfighters César Girón, Manuel Segura, and José Martínez "Limeño". In 2012, the bullring underwent a major renovation, adding a commercial area and accessibility improvements, and was reinaugurated on 6 October with bullfighters El Cordobés, El Fandi, and Juan José Padilla, with bulls from Benjumea.

== Transition to a cultural center ==
In February 2023, the bullring was purchased for €4.5 million by a Swedish investment group led by entrepreneur Marc Skarman through Arena Solo Málaga SL. After over two years of renovations, the plaza reopened in May 2025 with new facilities, including a theater, restaurant, art gallery, and event spaces.

== Bullfighting ==
The Fuengirola Bullring no longer hosts regular bullfights. However, it maintains an agreement with the local bullfighting school, allowing classes twice a week in the arena.
