= 91st Regiment of Foot (1759) =

- Active: 12 December 1759–1763
- Country: Kingdom of Great Britain (1756–1800)
- Branch: British Army
- Type: Line infantry

Commanders
- Colonel of the Regiment: Lt-Gen. Cadwallader Blayney, 9th Baron Blayney

The 91st Regiment of Foot had a brief existence as a British Army infantry regiment between 1759 and 1763. It was raised in Ireland, posted in turn to the West Indies and the Iberian Peninsula and finally disbanded in 1763. Some of the personnel then transferred to the 3rd Regiment of Foot, then stationed in Menorca. The Regimental Colonel throughout its life was Lt-Gen. Cadwallader Blayney, 9th Baron Blayney who had fought at the Battle of Minden in August 1759.
