= Charles Blayney, 8th Baron Blayney =

Charles Talbot Blayney, 8th Baron Blayney (27 January 1714 – 29 September 1761) was an Anglican priest in Ireland in the eighteenth century.

Blayney was born in Dublin and educated at St John's College, Cambridge. He was Dean of Killaloe from 1750 until his death.

== Notes ==
Peerage of Ireland
Preceded by Cadwallader Blayney	Baron Blayney; 1732–1761	Succeeded by Cadwallader Blayney
