= William Tisdall (priest) =

Irish clergyman

William Tisdall (1669–1735) was an Irish clergyman. He was well known in his own time as a writer on religious controversies, but he is now mainly remembered for his friendship with Jonathan Swift. The friendship was damaged by Tisdall's wish to marry Esther Johnson, Swift's beloved friend Stella.

== Life ==
He was born in Dublin, son of William and Anna Tisdall, who came from Carrickfergus. He entered Trinity College Dublin in 1687, was elected a Scholar of the College in 1692, a Fellow in 1696 and Doctor of Divinity in 1707. He became vicar of Kerry and of Ruavan, County Antrim in 1706, vicar of Drumcree, County Armagh, in 1711, and vicar of Belfast in 1712.

His friendship with Jonathan Swift began about 1695 when Swift was the prebend of Kilroot, near Carrickfergus, where Tisdall had relatives. Swift admired both Tisdall's theological views and his style of preaching. Their friendship however suffered a long rupture, due to their rivalry for the affections of "Stella", whom Swift had known since she was a child in the household of his employer Sir William Temple, and who moved to Ireland in 1702 to be closer to Swift. Tisdall wrote to Swift in 1704 announcing that he intended to propose to Stella, and Swift wrote in reply to dissuade him. Swift's letter was courteous enough in tone - he stressed the practical difficulties of such a marriage since Tisdall was not a rich man, and the Church had not yet found him a salaried position - but he privately expressed his disgust at Tisdall as an "interloper", and their friendship cooled off. It is not entirely clear whether or not Tisdall proposed to Stella, but if he did she refused. Stella, it seems, would marry Swift or no one: whether or not, as she is said to have claimed, they were secretly married in 1716 remains a matter of intense debate, on which no final conclusion is possible. After Stella's death in 1728, the two men were reconciled, and Tisdall witnessed Swift's will. Tisdall died on 8 June 1735.

Tisdall in 1706 married Eleanor Morgan, daughter of Hugh Morgan, of the prominent County Sligo landowning family, whose seat was at Cottlestown, and his wife Penelope Blayney, daughter of Henry Blayney, 2nd Baron Blayney, and had a son, also called William, who followed his father into the Church. Philip Tisdall, who was later, as Attorney General for Ireland, to be a very powerful figure in the Irish administration, was a cousin of William in the next generation.

== Works ==
Tisdall was well known in his own lifetime for his pamphlets on religious controversies, of which the best known was Conduct of the Dissenters in Ireland (1712). He joked that this pamphlet saved Ireland as surely as Swift's The Conduct of the Allies saved England; Swift was not amused by the comparison. He published little after 1715, apparently feeling that the political climate was unreceptive to his opinions.

== Sources ==
- Secombe, Thomas (1898). "Tisdal, William" . In Lee, Sidney (ed.). Dictionary of National Biography. Vol. 56. London: Smith, Elder & Co.
