= Baron Blayney =

Title in the Peerage of Ireland

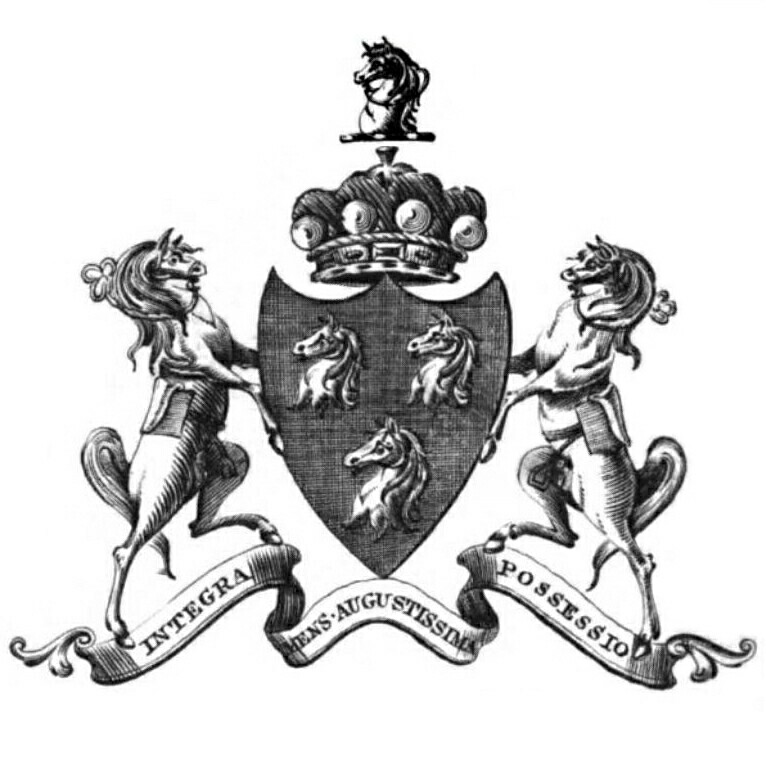
Coat of arms of the Barons Blayney.

Lord Blayney, Baron of Monaghan, in the County of Monaghan, was a title in the Peerage of Ireland. It was created in 1621 for the soldier Sir Edward Blayney. He was succeeded by his son, the second Baron, who was killed at the Battle of Benburb in 1646. His younger son, the fourth Baron (who succeeded his elder brother), represented County Monaghan in the Irish House of Commons. His elder son, the fifth Baron, was attainted by the Parliament of James II for supporting William of Orange. He had no sons and was succeeded by his younger brother, the sixth Baron. He was Governor of County Monaghan. His son, the seventh Baron, was Lord Lieutenant of County Monaghan. He was succeeded by his elder son, the eighth Baron. He was a clergyman and served as Dean of Killaloe. He had no surviving children and was succeeded by his younger brother, the ninth Baron. He was a Lieutenant-General in the Army. His younger son, the eleventh Baron (who succeeded his elder brother), was also a Lieutenant-General in the Army and fought in the Peninsular War. Lord Blayney also represented the rotten borough of Old Sarum in Parliament. His son, the twelfth Baron, sat as Conservative Member of Parliament for County Monaghan and was later an Irish representative peer from 1841 until his death. On his death in 1874 the title became extinct.

The family seat was at Blayney Castle, located near the town of Castleblayney, which was named after the first Baron.

== Barons Blayney (1621) ==
- Edward Blayney, 1st Baron Blayney (died 1629)
- Henry Blayney, 2nd Baron Blayney (died 1646)
- Edward Blayney, 3rd Baron Blayney (died 1669)
- Richard Blayney, 4th Baron Blayney (died 1670)
- Henry Vincent Blayney, 5th Baron Blayney (died 1689)
- William Blayney, 6th Baron Blayney (died 1705)
- Cadwallader Blayney, 7th Baron Blayney (1693–1732)
- Charles Talbot Blayney, 8th Baron Blayney (1714–1761)
- Cadwallader Blayney, 9th Baron Blayney (1720–1775)
- Cadwallader Davis Blayney, 10th Baron Blayney (1769–1784)
- Andrew Thomas Blayney, 11th Baron Blayney (1770–1834)
- Cadwallader Davis Blayney, 12th Baron Blayney (1802–1874)
