= Lublin Department =

Coordinates: 51°14′00″N 22°34′00″E

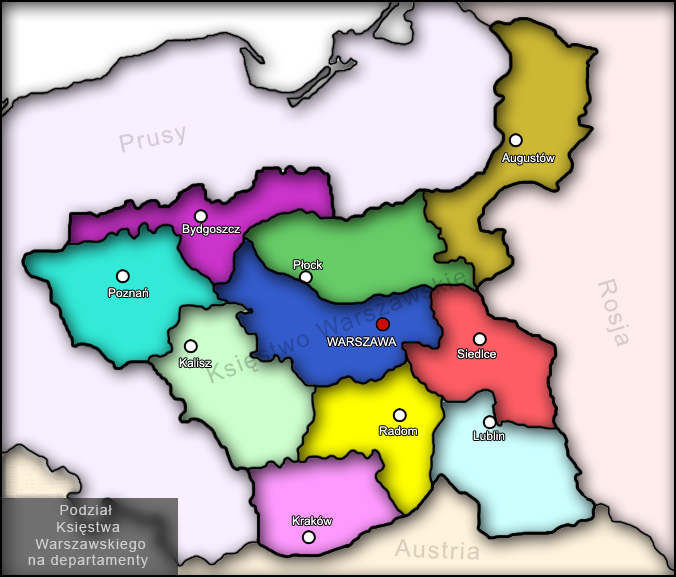
Administrative division of the Duchy of Warsaw, 1810–1815. Lublin Department is light blue in the south-east.

The Lublin Department (Polish: Departament Lubelski) was a unit of administrative division and local government in Polish Duchy of Warsaw in years 1810–1815. Its capital was Lublin. The division contained 10 counties. In 1815 it was transformed into the Lublin Voivodeship.
