= Castleblayney =

Town in County Monaghan, Ireland

Castleblayney Baile na Lorgan
- Town
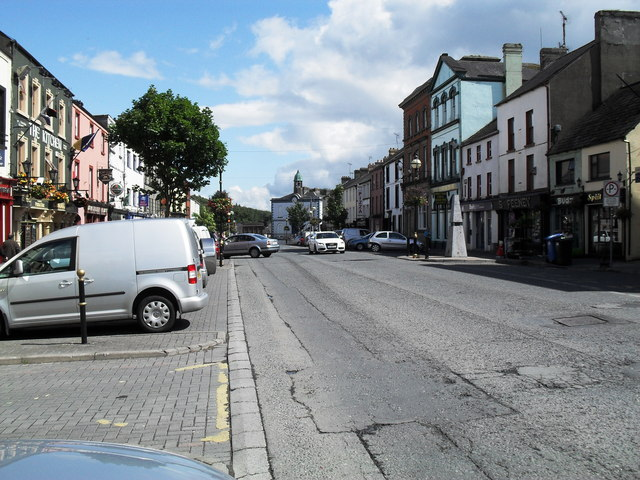
- West Street

- Location in Ireland
- Coordinates: 54°07′12″N 06°44′20″W
- Country: Ireland
- Province: Ulster
- County: Monaghan
- Elevation: 104 m (341 ft)

Population (2022)
  - Total: 3,926
- Eircode routing key: A75
- Telephone area code: +353(0)42
- Irish Grid Reference: H824199

Historical population
Year	Pop.	±%
1831	1,828	—
1841	2,134	+16.7%
1851	2,077	−2.7%
1861	1,822	−12.3%
1871	1,809	−0.7%
1881	1,810	+0.1%
1891	1,721	−4.9%
1901	1,576	−8.4%
1911	1,692	+7.4%
1926	1,550	−8.4%
1936	1,725	+11.3%
1946	1,769	+2.6%
1951	2,173	+22.8%
1956	2,143	−1.4%
1961	2,127	−0.7%
1966	2,083	−2.1%
1971	2,395	+15.0%
1981	3,473	+45.0%
1986	3,035	−12.6%
1991	2,938	−3.2%
1996	2,808	−4.4%
2002	2,936	+4.6%
2006	3,124	+6.4%
2011	3,634	+16.3%
2016	3,607	−0.7%
2022	3,926	+8.8%

Castleblayney (/ˌkæsəlˈbleɪni/; Irish: Baile na Lorgan) is a town in County Monaghan, Ireland. The town had a population of 3,926 as of the 2022 census. Castleblayney is near the border with County Armagh in Northern Ireland, and lies on the N2 road from Dublin to Derry and Letterkenny.

== Geography ==
The town lies above the western shore of Lough Muckno, the largest lake in County Monaghan. The River Fane flows eastwards from the lake to the Irish Sea at Dundalk in County Louth. As the Irish name of the lake ('the place where pigs swim') suggests, the area is associated with the Black Pig's Dyke, also known locally in parts of Counties Cavan and Monaghan as the Worm Ditch, an ancient Iron Age boundary of Ulster.

A few miles to the north-east is the highest elevation in County Monaghan, 'Mullyash', at altitude 317 m (1,034 ft).

Castleblayney is 26 kilometres (16 mi) north-west of Dundalk.

== History ==
The area was originally known as Baile na Lorgan ("town of the long low ridge"), anglicised as 'Ballynalurgan'. It was also sometimes called Caisleán Mathghamhna ('MacMahon Castle' or 'Castle MacMahon').

=== 17th and 18th centuries ===
The town of Castleblayney originated in the Tudor conquest of Gaelic Ulster in the Nine Years' War of 1594–1603. In 1611, the Crown granted forfeited lands in the area previously ruled by the Mac Mathghamhna (MacMahon) chieftains to Sir Edward Blayney, from Montgomeryshire in Wales, for his service to Queen Elizabeth I. Sir Edward was later created The 1st Baron Blayney, in July 1621. King James VI & I had already granted him appropriated Augustinian church land (or 'termon') at Muckno Friary on the northeastern side of the lake in the Churchill area (Mullandoy) in 1606/7. The small town 'founded' by Sir Edward Blayney in 1611 or 1612 is recorded as being called Castleblayney at least as early as 1663.

Muckno is also the name given to the Catholic parish (St. Mary's, Castleblayney, and St Patrick's, Oram, just three miles north-east of the town), which is part of the Diocese of Clogher. The Church of Ireland parish is also called Muckno (St Maeldoid's), and is part of the Church of Ireland Diocese of Clogher.

In 1762 a demonstration occurred in the town accompanied by a threatening military presence. This was connected with the 'Oakboys' movement that was active in the county. The protest was about compulsory work – to repair public roads as well as private roads and avenues in demesnes owned by the gentry – that was exacted from agricultural labourers for no wages.

=== The 11th Baron Blayney ===
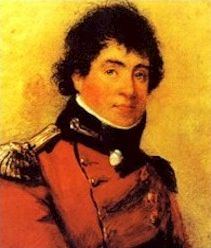
The 11th Baron Blayney.

The modern planned town – reminiscent of Plantation towns with its characteristic wide main street and with long, narrow individual gardens to the rear and out of sight – dates from c. 1830. The modern town was largely laid out under the direction of The 11th Baron Blayney (1770–1834), who inherited the family peerage and the large Blayney Estate as an adolescent in 1784. By about 1800, the young Lord Blayney had ordered and implemented major reforms in Castleblayney, greatly improving the prosperity and appearance of the town. Educated in France and Germany, the 11th Lord Blayney is famous for his distinguished military career, eventually rising to the rank of Lieutenant-General, having served in the West Indies, South America, southern Africa and the Napoleonic Wars as commander of the 89th Foot, popularly known as 'Blayney's Bloodhounds'. As a peer, he was very active in the suppression of the revolt of the United Irishmen in 1798.

It was the 11th Lord Blayney who had the modern Blayney Castle (also known as Castle Blayney) constructed around the year 1800. In 1799, Lord Blayney commissioned Robert Woodgate, a former student of Sir John Soane, to design the new Blayney Castle. Woodgate, a distinguished young architect, had first come over to Ireland in 1791 to supervise Soane's plans for Baronscourt, the new country house that was built for The 1st Marquess of Abercorn near Newtownstewart in County Tyrone. The new Blayney Castle was built in a restrained late Georgian style. It is thought that this new 'castle' (in reality a country house), located in the townland of Onomy, was built close to the site of the original Blayney Castle, of which nothing now survives above ground. The house built for the 11th Lord Blayney was later, in the 1850s and early 1860s, substantially altered and enlarged for Henry Thomas Hope and his wife.

Blayney Castle, renamed Hope Castle in the early 1850s, stands in a demesne or park on the eastern edge of Castleblayney town itself. It is thought that this demesne pre-dates the current 'castle'; that large parts of it had already been laid out by the early 1770s. The demesne was substantially improved for the 11th Lord Blayney by William Sawrey Gilpin in the early 1830s. However, the demesne has deteriorated since it came into public ownership in the 1980s. Almost all of the large Italianate Victorian extension to Hope Castle was demolished by Monaghan County Council in the 1980s.

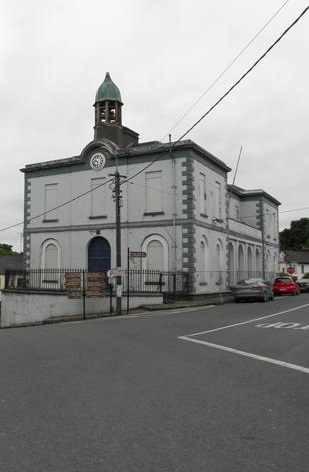
Castleblayney Town Hall

The 11th Lord Blayney also provided for the erection in Castleblayney of the current church buildings of the Catholic, Anglican and Presbyterian churches, being tolerant in religion if traditionalist in politics and strongly supportive of Empire and the Anglo-Irish 'Ascendancy'. Apart from the former Alms Houses (1876), which were interdenominationally managed, Castleblayney Town Hall (1790) is the only building of architectural merit.

In the early 1840s, what is now St Mary's Hospital was erected as a Workhouse for the very poor.

=== Hope family and after ===
In 1853, Cadwallader, 12th Baron Blayney (1802–1878), sometime Member of Parliament (MP) for County Monaghan, sold Blayney Castle and what remained of the Blayney Estate to Henry Thomas Hope of Deepdene House in Surrey, an extremely wealthy businessman who had also formerly served as a Member of Parliament at Westminster. The 12th Baron was the last Baron Blayney. The castle was renamed 'Hope Castle', as it is still called. Hope gave the Georgian castle with its splendid prospect a Victorian makeover that the present prettified building retains, externally at least. 'Castle' has always been a misnomer, since it was more of a 'Big House', mansion or manor house than a castle.

After his death in 1862, Hope's wife Anne inherited the estate. Soon after 1887 the Castle and demesne fell to the next heir, Hope's grandson Lord Francis Hope (1866–1941), who was famous for having sold the renowned family heirloom, the 'Hope Diamond'. Rather like his father, The 6th Duke of Newcastle-under-Lyne, Lord Francis lived very extravagantly and, despite his once vast family fortune, was declared bankrupt in 1896. From 1894 to 1902, he was married to May Yohé, the American actress. After 1916, Lord Francis no longer resided in the castle or in Ireland. He succeeded his elder brother to become The 8th Duke of Newcastle-under-Lyne in late May 1928.

Hope Castle was leased between 1900 and 1904 to Prince Arthur, Duke of Connaught and Strathearn, a son of Queen Victoria. The Duke served during those years as the commander of British military forces in Ireland, whose official residence was the Master's House at the Royal Hospital, in Kilmainham, Dublin. The Duke leased Hope Castle from the Pelham-Clinton-Hope family as his private country residence during these years.

The 8th Duke of Newcastle-under-Lyne (1866–1941; previously known as Lord Francis Hope) sold his life interest in the castle and the estate in 1928.

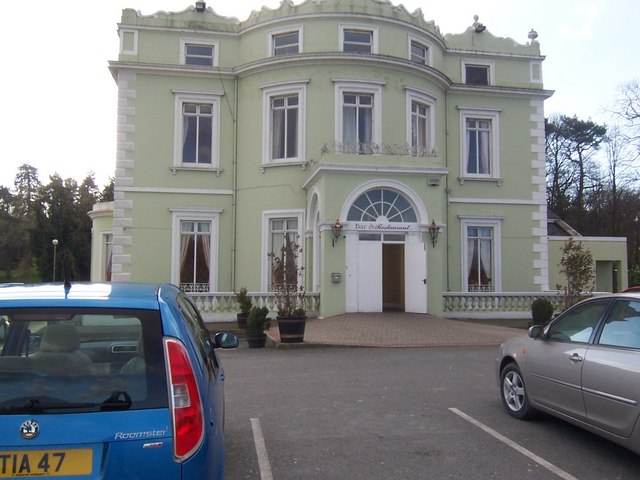
Hope Castle in 2008, prior to fire

Between 1919 and 1921, during the Irish War of Independence, the Castle was used as a barracks by the British Army. For some time afterwards it functioned as a hospital, and from 1943 to 1974 it was occupied by Franciscan nuns who also managed an adjacent guesthouse. In the 1980s Monaghan County Council purchased both Hope Castle and its surrounding demesne or park. It then proceeded in the 1980s to demolish the large Italianate Victorian extension to the castle. The council also allowed the remaining Woodgate interiors to be ripped out at this time. In October 2010 the castle was burnt down in an arson attack.

=== Town bombing ===
On 7 March 1976, a bomb exploded outside the Three Star Inn pub on the town's main street. A bicycle mechanic, Patrick Mone, was killed and 17 others were injured. The attack was one of several cross-border attacks linked to the Glenanne gang the worst sectarian violence of The Troubles.

== Council ==
The modern town of Castleblayney is administered by Monaghan County Council. It forms part of the Carrickmacross-Castleblayney Municipal District which elects six of the eighteen members of the council.

For over one hundred and sixty years the town had its own local or Town council until May 2014. Town government began in Castleblayney on 17 May 1853 when 21 Town Commissioners were elected on foot of a proclamation by Edward Eliot, 3rd Earl of St Germans, Lord Lieutenant of Ireland, dated 10 April 1853. In 1865 the Town Commissioners voted to bring the town under the Town Improvement (Ireland) Act 1847 and in 1899 the nine Town Commissioners were replaced by an Urban District Council, re-designated as a Town Council under the Local Government Act 2001. The Local Government Reform Act 2014 brought town government to an end replaced it with the integrated municipal district (town and rural areas) and county system.

== Facilities ==
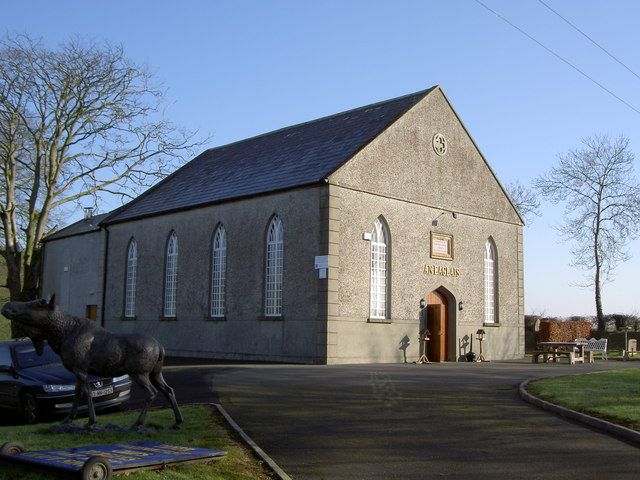
An Eaglais Amenity and Heritage Centre, Castleblayney

Amenities in Castleblayney include a Community Enterprise Centre which opened in 1987.

== Transport ==
The town is served by Bus Éireann, Ulsterbus and several private coach companies.

A €120m by-pass from Castleblayney to Clontibret opened on 5 November 2007, linking Castleblayney directly to the M1 Motorway and to Dublin. The bypass consists of 16 kilometres of 2+1 carriageway.

Castleblayney is no longer served by railway. Castleblayney railway station opened on 15 February 1849, closed to passengers on 14 October 1957, and finally closed altogether on 1 January 1960.

== Arts and culture ==
The Íontas Arts & Community Resource Centre is an arts and community facility located in a purpose-built facility in the town. It offers a wide range of arts activities, including drama, music and dance.

== Sport ==
The local Gaelic football club, Castleblayney Faughs GFC, was founded in November 1905. Castleblayney Hurling Club was founded in 1906. There are also two soccer clubs located in Castleblayney, Blayney Academy FC formed in 2010 and Blayney Rovers FC.

== Education ==
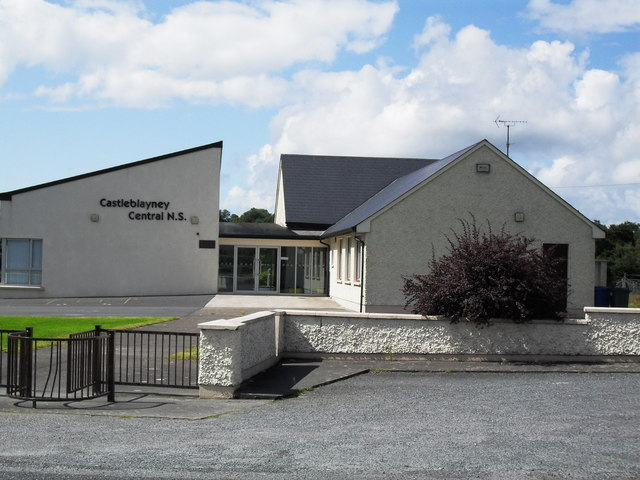
Castleblayney Central National School

The town has two second-level schools, Our Lady's Castleblayney and Castleblayney College.

There are five national schools in Castleblayney; Scoil na gCailíní, Scoil Mhuire na mBuachaillí, Convent Junior School, The Central School and Gaelscoil Lorgan.

== International relations ==
Castleblayney is twinned with two towns in France: Nogent-sur-Vernisson (Loiret department) and Marseillan (Hérault department).

== Notable people ==
- Andrew Thomas Blayney, 11th Baron Blayney (1770–1834), Anglo-Irish peer (see above)
- Eoin O'Duffy (1892–1944), General in the Irish Civil War and Garda Commissioner, was born at Caraghdoo, Laragh, near Lough Egish, south of Castleblayney.
- Clare Sheridan (1885–1970), sculptor
- Thomas Hughes (1885–1942), soldier and Victoria Cross recipient
- Prince Arthur, Duke of Connaught and Strathearn (1850–1942), son of Queen Victoria, Commander-in-Chief of the British Army in Ireland from 1900 to 1904, when he also rented Hope Castle in Castleblayney as a residence outside Dublin
- James McMahon Graham (1852–1945), who after emigrating became an attorney and United States Representative for Illinois
- Eamonn Toal, singer and Irish representative at the Eurovision Song Contest 2000
- Big Tom McBride (1936–2018), musician

== See also ==
- List of towns and villages in Ireland
- Market Houses in Ireland
