= Muckno Lake =

Freshwater lake in the northeast of Ireland

- Loch Mucnú (Irish)
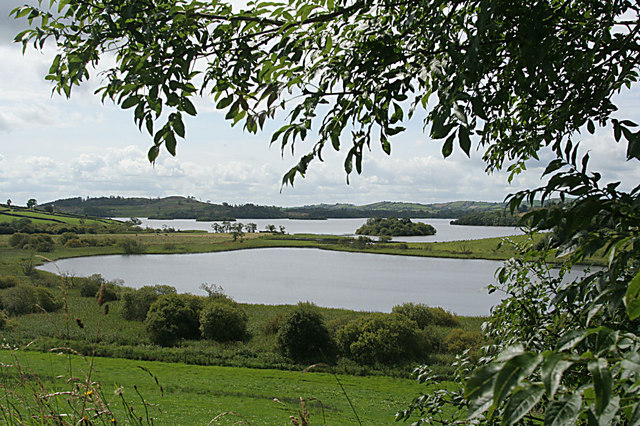

- Location in Ireland
- Location: County Monaghan
- Coordinates: 54°7′4″N 6°42′42″W
- Primary outflows: Clarebane River
- Catchment area: 109.08 km^{2} (42.1 sq mi)
- Basin countries: Ireland
- Max. length: 3.7 km (2 mi)
- Max. width: 1.0 km (0.6 mi)
- Surface area: 3.57 km^{2} (1.38 sq mi)
- Average depth: 4 m (13 ft)
- Max. depth: 20 m (66 ft)
- Surface elevation: 86 m (282 ft)

Muckno Lake (Irish: Loch Mucnú), also known as Lough Muckno, is a freshwater lake in the northeast of Ireland. It is located in County Monaghan beside the town of Castleblayney.

== Geography and hydrology ==
Muckno Lake measures about 4 km (2.5 mi) long and 1.0 km (0.6 mi) wide. It flows out to the Clarebane River, which connects the lake to nearby Lough Ross.

== Natural history ==
Fish species in Muckno Lake include European perch, common roach, common bream, gudgeon, northern pike and the critically endangered European eel.

== See also ==
- List of loughs in Ireland
