= Andrew Blayney, 11th Baron Blayney =

Anglo-Irish peer

Lieutenant-General The Right Honourable The Lord Blayney
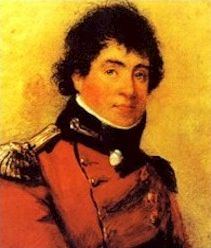
- Born: 30 November 1770; County Monaghan, Ireland
- Died: 8 April 1834 (aged 63); Dublin, Ireland
- Spouse: Mabella Alexander (m. 1796)
- Military career
- Allegiance: United Kingdom
- Branch: British Army
- Service years: 1789–1834
- Rank: Lieutenant-General
- Commands: 89th Regiment of Foot
- Conflicts: French Revolutionary Wars; Flanders campaign; Battle of Boxtel; Siege of Nijmegen; Irish Rebellion of 1798; Battle of Vinegar Hill; Mediterranean campaign; Siege of Malta; Egypt campaign; Napoleonic Wars; Hanover Expedition; British invasions of the River Plate; Peninsular War; Siege of Cádiz; Battle of Fuengirola (POW)

Lieutenant-General Andrew Thomas Blayney, 11th Baron Blayney (30 November 1770 – 8 April 1834), was an Anglo-Irish peer. He owned the Blayney estate at Castleblayney, County Monaghan, for fifty years from 1784 to 1834.

He married Marbella Alexander in July 1796.

As commanding officer of the 89th Regiment of Foot, "Blayney's Bloodhounds" as they were called, he fought with distinction in the Napoleonic Wars. He was taken prisoner at the battle of Fuengirola, when making a raid from Gibraltar into Spain against a small group of Polish soldiers a tenth his number, and was kept prisoner for four years by the French government. His sabre is currently on exhibition in the Czartoryski Museum, in Kraków.

He wrote a two-volume account of his experiences in the Napoleonic Wars - Narrative of a Forced Journey through Spain and France as a Prisoner of War in the Years 1810 to 1814, by Major-General Lord Blayney (London, 1814), in which he claims that he was captured by one of the O'Callaghans of Cullaville, a colonel in the French army and a prominent United Irishman who escaped after 1798. In fact, he was captured by Polish soldiers. The aforementioned colonel intervened when he was resisting an attempt by Polish soldiers to tear off his general's insignia - one of the soldiers aimed a bayonet at him, and at that moment the French colonel appeared and shielded the general with his own body.

During Blayney's long incarceration, the 2nd Earl of Caledon looked after his financial, domestic, and political affairs, and on his return, Blayney was given a seat in Parliament for Caledon's infamous "rotten borough" of Old Sarum, Wiltshire.

Lord Blayney died on 8 April 1834 and was succeeded by his son Cadwallader, the 12th and last lord.

== See also ==
- Baron Blayney

Parliament of the United Kingdom
Preceded by Nicholas Vansittart; Henry Alexander	Member of Parliament for Old Sarum; 1806–1807; With: Nicholas Vansittart	Succeeded by Nicholas Vansittart; Josias Porcher
Peerage of Ireland
Preceded by Cadwallader Blayney	Baron Blayney; 1784–1834	Succeeded by Cadwallader Blayney
