= 2024 Cavan County Council election =

Part of the 2024 Irish local elections

- 7 June 2024

All 18 seats on Cavan County Council 10 seats needed for a majority
	First party	Second party	Third party
Party	Fine Gael	Fianna Fáil	Sinn Féin
Last election	7	8	1
Seats won	6	6	3
Seat change	▼1	▼2	▲2
	Fourth party	Fifth party	Sixth party
Party	Aontú	Independent Ireland	Independent
Last election	1	New	1
Seats won	1	1	1
Seat change	Steady	▲1	Steady
- Results by Local Electoral Area

An election to all 18 seats on Cavan County Council was held on 7 June 2024 as part of the 2024 Irish local elections. County Cavan is divided into 3 local electoral areas (LEAs) to elect councillors for a five-year term of office on the electoral system of proportional representation by means of the single transferable vote (PR-STV).

The period for nominations ran from 10 a.m. on Saturday 11 May and ended at 12 p.m. on Saturday 18 May 2024. Candidates could be nominated by a registered political party, through the submission of 15 assents from voters in the local electoral area, or alternatively with a deposit of €100.

== Retiring incumbents ==
Constituency	Departing Councillor	Party
Cavan-Belturbet	Madeleine Argue	Fine Gael
Ballyjamesduff	Craig Lovett	Fianna Fáil

=== Analysis of Election ===
Fianna Fail and Fine Gael both emerged with 6 seats after the election though Fine Gael had a higher share of the vote. Fine Gael lost a seat in Cavan-Belturbet to Sinn Féin's Damien Brady who regained his former seat he lost in 2019 and Peter McVitty lost to his running-mate. Fianna Fáil lost 2 seats in the Ballyjamesduff LEA as Shane P. O'Reilly was re-elected under the Independent-Ireland banner and Sinn Féin's Noel Connell regained his former seat also at the party's expense. There was no change of party allegiance in the Bailieborough LEA though a change of personnel under the Fianna Fáil and Sinn Féin banners. Sinn Féin increased their numbers from 1 to 3 and the other 3 seats comprise members of Aontú, Independent-Ireland and one Independent.

== Results by party ==
Party	First-preference votes			Seats				
Party	Votes	% FPv	Swing (pp)	Cand.	2019	Out.	Elected 2024	Change
Fine Gael	9,553	28.17%	▼5.20%	7	7	7	6	▼1
Fianna Fáil	9,372	27.63%	▼11.29%	8	8	7	6	▼2
Sinn Féin	5,642	16.64%	▲4.26%	7	1	1	3	▲2
Aontú	2,756	8.13%	▲0.40%	3	1	1	1	Steady
Independent Ireland	2,521	7.43%	New	2	New	1	1	▲1
Labour	338	1.00%	▼1.20%	1	0	0	0	Steady
Green	104	0.31%	New	1	New	New	0	New
Irish Freedom	109	0.32%	New	1	New	New	0	New
The Irish People	958	2.82%	New	1	New	New	0	New
Independent	2,562	7.55%	▲3.70%	5	1	1	1	Steady
Total Valid	33,915	98.92						
Spoilt votes	372	1.08						
Total	34,287	100	—	36	18	18	18	Steady
Registered voters/Turnout	61,786	55.49						

== Results by local electoral area ==
*: Outgoing councillor elected in 2019.
†: Outgoing councillor coopted subsequent to the 2019 election.

=== Bailieborough–Cootehill ===
Bailieborough–Cootehill: 6 seats
Party	Candidate	FPv%	Count							
Party	Candidate	FPv%	1	2	3	4	5	6	7	8
Aontú	Sarah O'Reilly	14.74	1,770							
Fine Gael	Carmel Brady	14.03	1,684	1,687	1,728					
Fine Gael	Val Smith	11.59	1,392	1,396	1,408	1,409	1,424	1,480	1,529	1,551
Fianna Fáil	Clifford Kelly	10.29	1,235	1,238	1,286	1,286	1,308	1,466	1,533	1,552
Fianna Fáil	Aiden Fitzpatrick	9.79	1,175	1,179	1,198	1,205	1,294	1,355	1,384	1,412
Fianna Fáil	Niall Smith	9.06	1,088	1,099	1,111	1,114	1,168	1,233	1,496	1,547
Sinn Féin	Stiofán Conaty	8.92	1,071	1,073	1,174	1,175	1,244	1,326	1,836	
Sinn Féin	Paddy McDonald	6.35	763	774	905	906	978	1,122		
Independent Ireland	Kristofer Shekleton	5.39	647	653	727	725	914			
Independent	Gary Cosgrave	5.06	608	613	724	724				
Sinn Féin	Marina McEntee	2.61	313	315						
Independent	Fiona McCormack	1.68	202	204						
Independent	John O'Reilly	0.49	59	60						
Electorate: 21,410 (56.74%) Valid: 12,007 Spoilt: 140 Quota: 1,716 Turnout: 12,147

=== Ballyjamesduff ===
Ballyjamesduff: 6 seats
Party	Candidate	FPv%	Count							
Party	Candidate	FPv%	1	2	3	4	5	6	7	8
Independent Ireland	Shane P. O'Reilly	15.75	1,874							
Fine Gael	Trevor Smith	14.82	1,763							
Fine Gael	Winston Bennett	12.25	1,457	1,458	1,460	1,465	1,472	1,595	1,723	
Fianna Fáil	Phillip Brady	10.88	1,295	1,295	1,306	1,316	1,321	1,424	1,849	
Fine Gael	T.P. O'Reilly	10.52	1,252	1,258	1,331	1,381	1,399	1,477	1,563	1,639
Sinn Féin	Noel Connell	8.98	1,068	1,070	1,078	1,488	1,495	1,598	1,685	1,716
The Irish People	Lester Gordon	8.05	958	1,031	1,050	1,068	1,074	1,250	1,392	1,434
Fianna Fáil	Nathan Galligan	6.94	826	826	836	850	865	986		
Aontú	Gráinne McPhillips	6.40	761	773	792	816	821			
Sinn Féin	Angela Gaffney	4.50	535	537	569					
Irish Freedom	Kieran Goggins	0.92	109							
Electorate: 21,217 (56.61%) Valid: 11,898 Spoilt: 112 Quota: 1,700 Turnout: 12,010

=== Cavan–Belturbet ===
Cavan–Belturbet: 6 seats
Party	Candidate	FPv%	Count					
Party	Candidate	FPv%	1	2	3	4	5	6
Fianna Fáil	Áine Smith	17.61	1,763					
Independent	Brendan Fay	16.25	1,627					
Fianna Fáil	John Paul Feeley	10.49	1,050	1,159	1,194	1,293	1,323	1,349
Sinn Féin	Damien Brady	10.44	1,045	1,088	1,133	1,200	1,729	
Fine Gael	Niamh Brady	10.16	1,017	1,050	1,070	1,203	1,275	1,333
Fine Gael	Peter McVitty	9.87	988	1,048	1,080	1,166	1,192	1,209
Fianna Fáil	Patricia Walsh	9.39	940	994	1,006	1,101	1,296	1,386
Sinn Féin	Michael ‘Bricker’ Wall	8.46	847	856	872	984		
Labour	Liam van der Spek	3.38	338	353	365			
Aontú	Tinko Tinev	2.25	225	230	244			
Green	Kevin Murphy	1.04	104	106	109			
Independent	Susuana Komolafe	0.66	66	68	75			
Electorate: 19,159 (52.87%) Valid: 10,010 Spoilt: 120 Quota: 1,431 Turnout: 10,130

== Changes ==
=== Co-options ===
Party	Outgoing	LEA	Reason	Date	Co-optee
Aontú	Sarah O'Reilly	Bailieborough–Cootehill	Elected to 27th Seanad at the 2025 Seanad election	28 March 2025	Adrian Rogers
