= 2019 Cavan County Council election =

Part of the 2019 Irish local elections

- 24 May 2019

18 seats on Cavan County Council
	First party	Second party	Third party
Party	Fianna Fáil	Fine Gael	Sinn Féin
Seats won	8	7	1
Seat change	▲1	Steady	▼3
	Fourth party	Fifth party
Party	Aontú	Independent
Seats won	1	1
Seat change	▲1	▲1
- Results by Local Electoral Area

An election to all 18 seats on Cavan County Council took place on 24 May 2019 as part of the 2019 Irish local elections. Councillors were elected for a five-year term of office from three local electoral areas (LEAs) by single transferable vote. The 2018 boundary review committee did not recommend any alteration to the LEAs which had been in place in County Cavan at the 2014 election.

== Overview ==
Sinn Féin lost all but one of its seats. Fianna Fáil gained a seat, to give a total of eight seats. Independent candidate Brendan Fay was elected and became the first Independent councillor in the county since 1999. Fine Gael returned with the same number of seats as at the previous election.

== Results by party ==
Party	Seats	±	1st pref	FPv%	±%
Fianna Fáil	8	▲1	12,492	38.92	▼1.56
Fine Gael	7	Steady	10,712	33.37	▼3.29
Sinn Féin	1	▼3	3,974	12.38	▼5.79
Aontú	1	▲1	2,482	7.73	New
Labour	0	Steady	705	2.20	▲1.61
People Before Profit	0	Steady	498	1.55	New
Independent	1	▲1	1,236	3.85	▼0.21
Total	18	Steady	32,099	100.00	Steady

== Results by local electoral area ==
*: Outgoing councillor elected in 2014.
†: Outgoing councillor coopted subsequent to the 2014 election.

=== Bailieborough–Cootehill ===
Bailieborough–Cootehill: 6 seats
Party	Candidate	FPv%	Count							
Party	Candidate	FPv%	1	2	3	4	5	6	7	8
Aontú	Sarah O'Reilly	14.93%	1,704							
Fine Gael	Val Smith	10.07%	1,150	1,158	1,163	1,173	1,263	1,512	1,643	
Fine Gael	Carmel Brady	8.94%	1,021	1,035	1,038	1,064	1,152	1,206	1,505	1,669
Fianna Fáil	Clifford Kelly	11.94%	1,363	1,365	1,369	1,425	1,448	1,543	1,557	1,611
Fianna Fáil	Aiden Fitzpatrick	7.93%	905	910	917	1,042	1,101	1,274	1,380	1,502
Sinn Féin	Paddy McDonald	6.76%	772	782	801	941	980	1,005	1,075	1,500
Fianna Fáil	Francis McDermott	8.14%	929	930	936	1,009	1,131	1,214	1,302	1,353
Fianna Fáil	Gerry Murray	6.88%	785	791	794	822	829			
Sinn Féin	Bridget Boyle	6.84%	781	804	807	824	883	916	938	
Fine Gael	John O'Hare	5.79%	661	665	670	699				
Fine Gael	Shirley Hall	5.52%	630	642	652	714	860	880		
Fianna Fáil	P.J. Barry	5.26%	601	606	614					
Labour	Mary Roche	1.00%	114							
Electorate: 20,421 Valid: 11,416 Spoilt: 249 Quota: 1,631 Turnout: 11,665 (57.12%)

=== Ballyjamesduff ===
Ballyjamesduff: 6 seats
Party	Candidate	FPv%	Count				
Party	Candidate	FPv%	1	2	3	4	5
Fine Gael	Trevor Smith	16.20%	1,826				
Fianna Fáil	Shane P. O'Reilly (Note: Change in affiliation after 2019; see below.)	15.11%	1,703				
Fine Gael	T.P. O'Reilly	13.98%	1,576	1,635			
Fine Gael	Winston Bennett	13.28%	1,497	1,527	1,533	1,544	1,694
Fianna Fáil	Craig Lovett	11.45%	1,290	1,356	1,389	1,446	1,642
Fianna Fáil	Philip "The Gunner" Brady	11.78%	1,328	1,339	1,360	1,375	1,489
Sinn Féin	Noel Connell	7.13%	804	826	840	1,171	1,307
Aontú	Gráinne McPhillips	6.90%	778	796	808	842	
Sinn Féin	Geraldine Harten	4.16%	469	478	484		
Electorate: 20,222 Valid: 11,271 Spoilt: 204 Quota: 1,611 Turnout: 11,475 (56.75%)

=== Cavan–Belturbet ===
Cavan–Belturbet: 6 seats
Party	Candidate	FPv%	Count						
Party	Candidate	FPv%	1	2	3	4	5	6	7
Fianna Fáil	John Paul Feeley	15.02%	1,414						
Independent	Brendan Fay	13.13%	1,236	1,237	1,241	1,265	1,349		
Fine Gael	Madeleine Argue	13.02%	1,225	1,289	1,294	1,337	1,392		
Fianna Fáil	Patricia Walsh	11.26%	1,060	1,067	1,075	1,113	1,176	1,389	
Fianna Fáil	Seán Smith	11.84%	1,114	1,124	1,150	1,155	1,174	1,244	1,246
Fine Gael	Peter McVitty	10.14%	954	1,007	1,020	1,027	1,039	1,144	1,159
Sinn Féin	Damien Brady	7.63%	718	722	729	922	1,006	1,096	1,106
Labour	Liam van der Spek	6.28%	591	608	611	643	761		
People Before Profit	Emmett Smith	5.29%	498	500	502	567			
Sinn Féin	Daniel Downey	4.57%	430	434	435				
Fine Gael	Seán McKiernan, Jnr.	1.83%	172						
Electorate: 18,308 Valid: 9,412 Spoilt: 188 Quota: 1,345 Turnout: 9,600 (52.44%)

== Results by gender ==
2019 Cavan County Council election Candidates by gender
Gender	Number of candidates	% of candidates	Elected councillors	% of councillors
Men	24	72.7%	14	77.8%
Women	9	27.3%	4	22.2%
TOTAL	33		18	

== Changes ==
=== Co-options ===
Party	Outgoing	LEA	Reason	Date	Co-optee
Fianna Fáil	Seán Smith	Cavan–Belturbet	Death.	14 March 2023	Áine Smith

=== Changes in Affiliation ===
Name	LEA	Elected as	New affiliation	Date
Shane P. O'Reilly	Ballyjamesduff	Fianna Fáil	Independent	June 2020
Shane P. O'Reilly	Ballyjamesduff	Independent	Independent Ireland	February 2024
