= 2004 Cavan County Council election =

2004 Irish local government election

← 1999	5 June 2004	2009 →

All 25 seats on Cavan County Council
	First party	Second party	Third party
Party	Fianna Fáil	Fine Gael	Sinn Féin
Seats won	11	11	3
Seat change	-2	+2	+1
	Fourth party
Party	Independent
Seats won	0
Seat change	-1
- Map showing the area of Cavan County Council
Council control after election
TBD

An election to Cavan County Council took place on 5 June 2004 as part of that year's Irish local elections. 25 councillors were elected from four local electoral areas (LEAs) by PR-STV voting for a five-year term of office.

== Results by party ==
Party	Seats	±	First Pref. votes	FPv%	±%
Fine Gael	11	+2	13,889	43.97	
Fianna Fáil	11	-2	13,001	41.16	
Sinn Féin	3	+1	3,671	11.62	
Independent	0	-1	787	2.49	
Totals	25	-	31,588	100.00	—

== Results by local electoral area ==
=== Bailieborough ===
Bailieborough - 7 seats
Party	Candidate	FPv%	Count									
Party	Candidate	FPv%	1	2	3	4	5	6	7	8	9	10
Fine Gael	Joe O'Reilly*	14.62	1,291									
Fine Gael	Aidan Boyle*	11.50	997	1,009	1,012	1,153						
Fianna Fáil	Clifford Kelly*	10.47	925	929	978	983	983	1,141				
Fine Gael	Fred Kettyle	10.24	904	938	958	1,046	1,061	1,228				
Sinn Féin	Paddy McDonald	10.20	901	931	985	1,003	1,007	1,070	1,081	1,089	1,227	
Fianna Fáil	Francis McDermott*	9.51	840	847	878	882	883	924	935	942	1,015	1,040
Fianna Fáil	Michael McCarey	7.39	653	655	671	710	721	735	745	749	861	877
Fianna Fáil	Turlough Smith*	6.63	586	600	688	730	733	745	754	760	851	860
Independent	Winston Turner*	5.88	519	544	571	606	608	670	717	728		
Fine Gael	Margaret O'Reilly	5.81	518	538	545	584	596					
Fine Gael	Matt McPhillips	5.41	391	420	426							
Fianna Fáil	Eamonn Donnelly	5.23	307	316								
Electorate: 13,247 Valid: 8,832 (66.67%) Spoilt: 167 Quota: 1,105 Turnout: 8,999 (67.93%)

=== Ballyjamesduff ===
Ballyjamesduff - 6 seats
Party	Candidate	FPv%	Count						
Party	Candidate	FPv%	1	2	3	4	5	6	7
Fine Gael	Paddy O'Reilly*	14.04	1,109	1,213					
Fine Gael	Paddy Smith	12.05	952	993	1,046	1,065	1,395		
Fianna Fáil	Shane P. O'Reilly	11.14	880	924	995	1,025	1,042	1,056	1,067
Fianna Fáil	Francie Fitzsimons*	10.70	845	865	912	919	954	992	1,001
Fine Gael	Mary Brady	10.46	826	924	969	983	1,206		
Sinn Féin	Pauline Tully-McCauley*	9.76	771	830	891	896	1,002	1,063	1,097
Fianna Fáil	Danny Brady*	9.50	750	788	957	957	1,020	1,048	1,071
Fine Gael	Dessie Boylan*	8.81	696	723	814	819			
Fianna Fáil	Patsy Sheridan	7.10	561	594					
Independent	Sean Sheridan	3.39	268						
Labour	Margaret Hopkins	3.04	240						
Electorate: 12,029 Valid: 7,898 (65.66%) Spoilt: 117 Quota: 1,129 Turnout: 8,015 (66.63%)

=== Belturbet ===
Belturbet - 5 seats
Party	Candidate	FPv%	Count					
Party	Candidate	FPv%	1	2	3	4	5	6
Fine Gael	Maura Maguire-Lynch*	21.03	1,316					
Fianna Fáil	Seán Smith*	16.93	1,059					
Fine Gael	Peter McVitty*	15.97	999	1,195				
Fianna Fáil	Anthony Vesey*	13.97	874	891	929	941	946	1,055
Fianna Fáil	Eddie Feeley*	11.65	729	732	744	821	828	942
Fianna Fáil	Seamus McGahern	8.68	543	582	613	629	631	732
Sinn Féin	Donal Carlin	6.78	424	435	450	622	624	
Sinn Féin	Eddie Fitzpatrick	5.00	313	320	327			
Electorate: 9,190 Valid: 6,257 (68.08%) Spoilt: 124 Quota: 1,043 Turnout: 6,381 (69.43%)

=== Cavan ===
Cavan - 7 seats
Party	Candidate	FPv%	Count						
Party	Candidate	FPv%	1	2	3	4	5	6	7
Fine Gael	Andrew Boylan*	15.25	1,312						
Sinn Féin	Charlie Boylan*	14.67	1,262						
Fine Gael	Madeleine Argue*	14.08	1,211						
Fianna Fáil	T.P. Smith*	10.35	890	930	992	1,006	1,163		
Fianna Fáil	Gerry Murray*	8.50	731	738	763	770	853	870	1,141
Fine Gael	Paul Cooney	8.07	694	750	774	806	841	847	877
Fine Gael	Winston Bennett	7.82	673	751	769	812	836	844	1,024
Fianna Fáil	Charlie Fleming*	7.56	650	656	675	678	769	784	
Fianna Fáil	Patricia Walsh	7.37	634	657	677	696	849	890	1,075
Fianna Fáil	Ray Carolan	6.32	544	570	588	605			
Electorate: 14,238 Valid: 8,601 (60.41%) Spoilt: 171 Quota: 1,076 Turnout: 8,772 (61.61%)
