= 2014 Cavan County Council election =

Part of the 2014 Irish local elections

- 23 May 2014

All 18 seats on Cavan County Council
| | First party | Second party | Third party |
|---|---|---|---|
| Party | Fianna Fáil | Fine Gael | Sinn Féin |
| Seats won | 7 | 7 | 4 |
| Seat change | ▼1 | ▼6 | Steady |
- Map showing the area of Cavan County Council
Cathaoirleach before election
Val Smith
FG
Subsequent Cathaoirleach
Shane O'Reilly
FF

An election to all 18 seats on Cavan County Council took place on 23 May 2014 as part of the 2014 Irish local elections, a reduction from 25 at the previous election. County Cavan was divided into three local electoral areas to elect councillors for a five-year term of office on the electoral system of proportional representation by means of the single transferable vote (PR-STV).

== Administrative changes ==
The town councils of Belturbet and Cavan were abolished.

Ahead of the 2014 election, County Cavan was redrawn into three electoral areas, a reduction in one from four, and the number of councillors was reduced to 18, from a previous total of 25.

== Analysis ==
Fianna Fáil had a good election, losing one seat overall compared to 2009. By contrast Fine Gael lost 6 seats and their overall majority. This was one of the few Councils where Sinn Féin did not make gains as the party returned with the same number they had held in 2009.

== Results by party ==
| Party | Seats | ± | 1st pref | FPv% | ±% |
|---|---|---|---|---|---|
| Fianna Fáil | 7 | ▼1 | 12,810 | 40.48 | |
| Fine Gael | 7 | ▼6 | 11,615 | 36.66 | |
| Sinn Féin | 4 | Steady | 5,751 | 18.17 | |
| Independent | 0 | Steady | 1,286 | 4.06 | |
| Labour | 0 | Steady | 187 | 0.59 | |
| Total | 18 | ▼7 | 31,534 | 100.00 | — |

== Results by local electoral area ==
*: Outgoing councillor elected in 2014.

=== Bailieborough–Cootehill ===
Bailieborough–Cootehill: 6 seats
| Party | Candidate | FPv% | Count | | | | | | | | |
| Party | Candidate | FPv% | 1 | 2 | 3 | 4 | 5 | 6 | 7 | 8 | 9 |
|---|---|---|---|---|---|---|---|---|---|---|---|
| Fianna Fáil | Niamh Smyth† | 16.06 | 1,886 | | | | | | | | |
| Fianna Fáil | Clifford Kelly | 10.11 | 1,187 | 1,199 | 1,215 | 1,226 | 1,387 | 1,432 | 1,489 | 1,494 | 1,512 |
| Fianna Fáil | Fergal Curtin | 9.41 | 1,105 | 1,146 | 1,159 | 1,176 | 1,187 | 1,276 | 1,328 | 1,493 | 1,543 |
| Fine Gael | Val Smith | 9.32 | 1,095 | 1,101 | 1,122 | 1,194 | 1,233 | 1,260 | 1,438 | 1,553 | 1,596 |
| Sinn Féin | Charlie Boylan | 8.80 | 1,034 | 1,038 | 1,084 | 1,095 | 1,123 | 1,188 | 1,218 | | |
| Sinn Féin | Paddy McDonald | 7.48 | 879 | 924 | 959 | 1,036 | 1,100 | 1,185 | 1,292 | 1,844 | |
| Fianna Fáil | Francis McDermott | 7.44 | 874 | 906 | 923 | 946 | 998 | 1,138 | 1,369 | 1,401 | 1,416 |
| Fianna Fáil | Don Smith | 6.89 | 809 | 823 | 854 | 862 | 868 | | | | |
| Fine Gael | John O'Hare | 6.21 | 729 | 748 | 779 | 911 | 1,038 | 1,086 | | | |
| Fine Gael | Carmel Brady | 6.12 | 719 | 724 | 747 | 809 | 928 | 1,207 | 1,531 | 1,660 | 1,700 |
| Fine Gael | David Blake | 5.18 | 608 | 612 | 636 | 706 | | | | | |
| Fine Gael | Séan McKiernan Jnr | 4.12 | 484 | 505 | 519 | | | | | | |
| Independent | Harry Henry Reburn | 1.46 | 171 | 174 | | | | | | | |
| Independent | Val Martin | 1.40 | 165 | 167 | | | | | | | |
Electorate: 19,701 Valid: 11,745 (59.62%) Spoilt: 153 Quota: 1,678 Turnout: 11,898 (60.39%)

=== Ballyjamesduff ===
Ballyjamesduff: 6 seats
| Party | Candidate | FPv% | Count | | | |
| Party | Candidate | FPv% | 1 | 2 | 3 | 4 |
|---|---|---|---|---|---|---|
| Sinn Féin | Noel Connell | 16.36 | 1,753 | | | |
| Fine Gael | Winston Bennett | 14.41 | 1,544 | | | |
| Fine Gael | Paddy Smith | 13.86 | 1,485 | 1,533 | | |
| Fianna Fáil | Philip Brady | 13.25 | 1,420 | 1,458 | 1,689 | |
| Fianna Fáil | Shane P. O'Reilly | 12.69 | 1,360 | 1,392 | 1,423 | 1,458 |
| Fine Gael | Paddy O'Reilly | 11.66 | 1,250 | 1,273 | 1,544 | |
| Fianna Fáil | Craig Lovett | 10.53 | 1,129 | 1,182 | 1,308 | 1,415 |
| Fine Gael | Mary Brady | 7.25 | 777 | 804 | 804 | |
Electorate: 19,362 Valid: 10,718 (55.36%) Spoilt: 156 Quota: 1,532 Turnout: 10,874 (56.16%)

=== Cavan–Belturbet ===
Cavan–Belturbet: 6 seats
| Party | Candidate | FPv% | Count | | | | | | | |
| Party | Candidate | FPv% | 1 | 2 | 3 | 4 | 5 | 6 | 7 | 8 |
|---|---|---|---|---|---|---|---|---|---|---|
| Fianna Fáil | John Paul Feeley | 13.67 | 1,240 | 1,245 | 1,267 | 1,290 | 1,307 | | | |
| Sinn Féin | Damien Brady | 13.47 | 1,222 | 1,236 | 1,266 | 1,290 | 1,314 | | | |
| Fine Gael | Madeline Argue | 12.01 | 1,089 | 1,092 | 1,097 | 1,264 | 1,349 | | | |
| Fianna Fáil | Seán Smith | 11.70 | 1,061 | 1,064 | 1,072 | 1,078 | 1,116 | 1,123 | 1,133 | 1,331 |
| Fine Gael | Peter McVitty | 11.50 | 1,043 | 1,046 | 1,068 | 1,133 | 1,333 | | | |
| Sinn Féin | Eugene Greenan†† | 9.51 | 863 | 870 | 888 | 948 | 957 | 961 | 964 | 1,106 |
| Fianna Fáil | Patricia Walsh | 8.15 | 739 | 741 | 745 | 811 | 823 | 829 | 831 | 890 |
| Independent | Seamus Fitzpatrick | 6.07 | 551 | 586 | 618 | 637 | 744 | 765 | 787 | |
| Fine Gael | Barry Wilson | 5.48 | 497 | 501 | 505 | 531 | | | | |
| Fine Gael | Jacqui Lewis | 3.25 | 295 | 296 | 300 | | | | | |
| Labour | Mary Croke | 2.06 | 187 | 191 | 201 | | | | | |
| Independent | Eamon Murray | 1.76 | 160 | 190 | | | | | | |
| Independent | Noreen Briddigkeit Quinn | 0.75 | 68 | | | | | | | |
| Independent | Mickey Lee | 0.62 | 56 | | | | | | | |
Electorate: 17,468 Valid: 9,071 (51.93%) Spoilt: 137 Quota: 1,296 Turnout: 9,208 (52.71%)

== Changes ==
=== Co-options ===
| Party | Outgoing | LEA | Reason | Date | Co-optee |
|---|---|---|---|---|---|
| Fianna Fáil | Niamh Smyth | Bailieborough-Cootehill | Elected to the 32nd Dáil at the 2016 general election. | 15 March 2016 | Sarah O'Reilly |
| Sinn Féin | Eugene Greenan | Cavan-Belturbet | Resignation | 9 September 2017 | Daniel Downey |

=== Changes in affiliation ===
| Name | LEA | Elected as | New affiliation | Date |
|---|---|---|---|---|
| Sarah O'Reilly | Bailieborough-Cootehill | Fianna Fáil | Aontú | 7 December 2018 |
