= 2009 Cavan County Council election =

Part of the 2009 Irish local elections

← 2004	5 June 2009	2014 →

All 25 seats on Cavan County Council
	First party	Second party	Third party
Party	Fine Gael	Fianna Fáil	Sinn Féin
Seats won	13	8	4
Seat change	+2	-3	+1
- Map showing the area of Cavan County Council
Council control after election
Fine Gael

An election to Cavan County Council took place on 5 June 2009 as part of that year's Irish local elections. 25 councillors were elected from four local electoral areas (LEAs) for a five-year term of office on the electoral system of proportional representation by means of the single transferable vote (PR-STV).

== Results by party ==
Party	Seats	±	First Pref. votes	FPv%	±%
Fine Gael	13	+2	16,051	45.64	
Fianna Fáil	8	-3	12,253	34.84	
Sinn Féin	4	+1	3,815	10.85	
Totals	25	-	35,166	100.00	—

== Results by local electoral area ==
=== Bailieborough ===
Bailieborough - 7 seats
Party	Candidate	FPv%	Count							
Party	Candidate	FPv%	1	2	3	4	5	6	7	8
Fianna Fáil	Niamh Smyth	10.01	1,019	1,061	1,115	1,285				
Fine Gael	David Blake	9.35	952	992	1,014	1,042	1,043	1,104	1,117	1,151
Fine Gael	Aidan Boyle*	8.95	911	932	967	989	989	1,133	1,542	
Fine Gael	John O'Hare	8.67	882	894	925	1,093	1,096	1,188	1,226	1,277
Fianna Fáil	Clifford Kelly*	8.57	872	886	893	959	961	970	1,069	1,111
Fine Gael	Seán McKiernan Jnr*	8.42	857	888	963	989	990	1,288		
Sinn Féin	Paddy McDonald*	8.35	850	883	957	1,024	1,026	1,070	1,122	1,165
Fianna Fáil	Fergal Curtin	8.23	838	843	855	901	903	1,006	1,185	1,250
Fianna Fáil	Michael McCarey*	7.62	776	786	811	878	879	917		
Fine Gael	Fred Kettyle*	7.44	757	768	848	867	867			
Fianna Fáil	Francis McDermott*	6.97	709	721	738					
Independent	Winston Turner	4.53	461	487						
Green	Alex Ivanov	2.89	294							
Electorate: 15,404 Valid: 10,178 (66.07%) Spoilt: 129 Quota: 1,273 Turnout: 10,307 (67.91%)

=== Ballyjamesduff ===
Ballyjamesduff - 6 seats
Party	Candidate	FPv%	Count					
Party	Candidate	FPv%	1	2	3	4	5	6
Fine Gael	Paddy Smith*	13.14	1,177	1,239	1,289			
Fine Gael	Paddy O'Reilly*	12.76	1,143	1,171	1,178	1,281		
Fianna Fáil	Shane P. O'Reilly*	12.67	1,135	1,147	1,200	1,383		
Sinn Féin	Pauline Tully-McCauley*	10.97	982	1,021	1,094	1,119	1,127	1,242
Fianna Fáil	Danny Brady*	10.54	944	971	1,080	1,166	1,233	1,277
Fine Gael	Dessie Boylan	9.46	847	876	960	975	979	1,161
Fine Gael	Mary Brady*	9.35	837	863	877	887	890	1,106
Fine Gael	Fintan Cahill	7.81	699	715	725	777	798	
Fianna Fáil	Peter Brady	5.20	466	479	508			
Fianna Fáil	Ciaran McEvoy	4.68	419	445				
Independent	Connie Colwell	3.42	306					
Electorate: 14,262 Valid: 8,955 (62.79%) Spoilt: 91 Quota: 1,280 Turnout: 9,046 (63.43%)

=== Belturbet ===
Belturbet - 5 seats
Party	Candidate	FPv%	Count								
Party	Candidate	FPv%	1	2	3	4	5	6	7	8	9
Fine Gael	Maura Maguire-Lynch*	18.54	1,334								
Fianna Fáil	John Paul Feeley*	12.81	922	952	954	963	973	990	995	1,034	1,098
Fine Gael	Peter McVitty*	12.45	896	900	953	1,016	1,121	1,289			
Fianna Fáil	Seán Smith*	12.27	883	896	905	937	945	950	957	1,012	1,083
Sinn Féin	Damien Brady	8.74	629	637	642	723	740	767	786	852	1,004
Fianna Fáil	Seamus McGahern	8.41	605	632	644	649	739	779	788	879	1,003
Independent	Anthony Vesey*	6.09	438	454	457	484	485	539	559		
Independent	Seamus Fitzpatrick	5.96	429	440	444	473	488	578	607	760	
Fine Gael	John McDonald	4.64	334	350	373	390	448				
Fine Gael	Philip Miney	4.17	300	303	320	322					
Independent	Peadar Neary	4.00	288	292	298						
Fianna Fáil	Sinead Donohoe	1.90	137								
Electorate: 10,510 Valid: 7,195 (68.46%) Spoilt: 115 Quota: 1,200 Turnout: 7,310 (69.55%)

=== Cavan ===
Cavan - 7 seats
Party	Candidate	FPv%	Count						
Party	Candidate	FPv%	1	2	3	4	5	6	7
Sinn Féin	Charlie Boylan*	15.32	1,354						
Fine Gael	Madeleine Argue*	13.95	1,233						
Fine Gael	Winston Bennett*	12.04	1,064	1,086	1,115				
Fine Gael	Andrew Boylan*	10.47	925	968	1,017	1,115			
Fine Gael	Val Smith	10.22	903	939	954	976	1,002	1,012	1,020
Labour	Liam Hogan	9.40	831	886	897	921	979	995	997
Fianna Fáil	Gerry Murray*	8.70	769	789	794	888	1,105		
Fianna Fáil	Patricia Walsh*	8.17	722	741	752	911	1,131		
Fianna Fáil	Madge Fleming	6.52	576	595	599	655			
Fianna Fáil	T.P. Smith*	5.22	461	496	500				
Electorate: 14,362 Valid: 8,838 (61.54%) Spoilt: 171 Quota: 1,105 Turnout: 8,995 (62.63%)
