= Pauline Tully =

Irish politician

Senator Pauline Tully
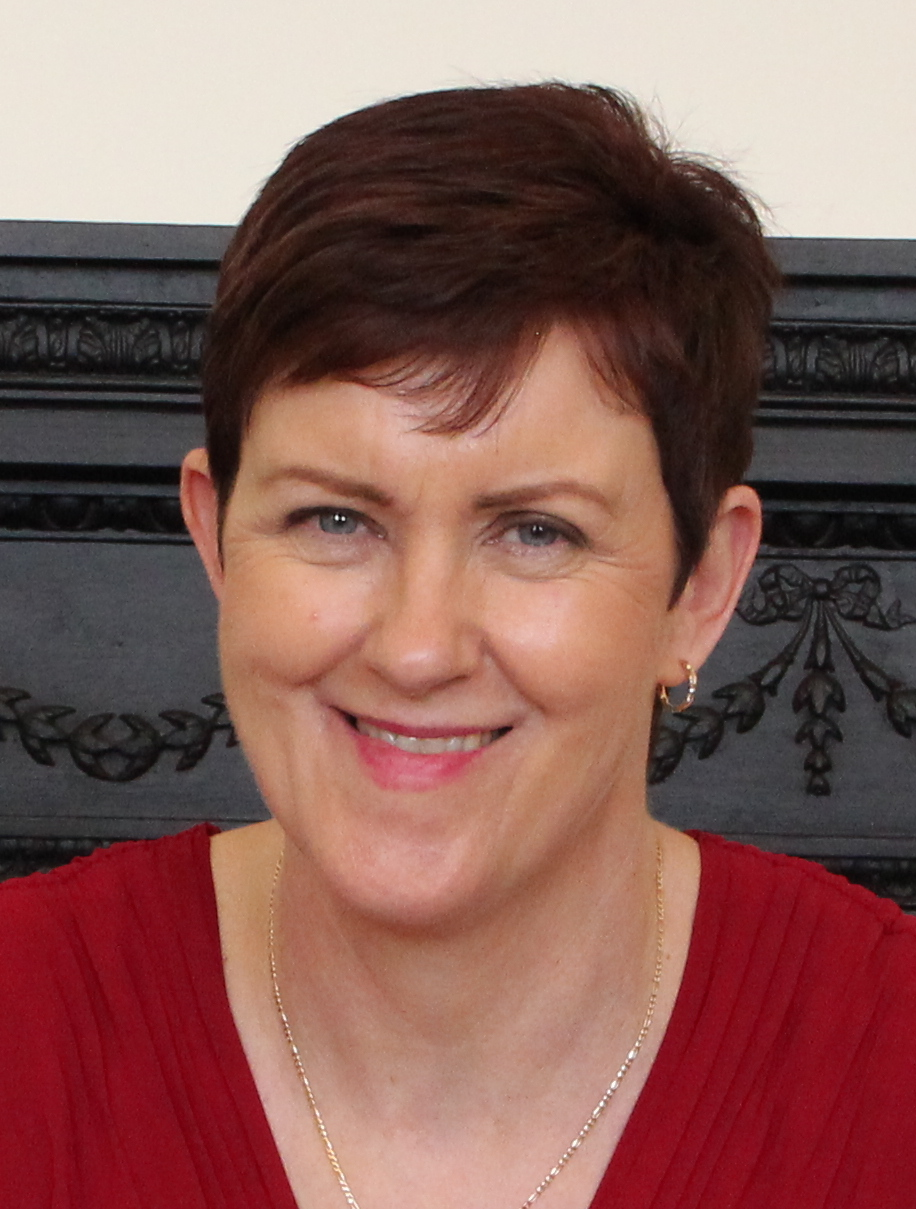
- Tully in 2025

Senator
- Incumbent
- Assumed office January 2025
- Constituency: Cultural and Educational Panel

Teachta Dála
- In office February 2020 – November 2024
- Constituency: Cavan–Monaghan

Personal details
- Born: 1970/1971 (age 55–56) Cavan, Ireland
- Party: Sinn Féin
- Spouse: Pearse McAuley (m. 2003; sep. 2014)
- Children: 2

Pauline Tully (formerly Pauline Tully-McAuley; born 1970/1971) is an Irish Sinn Féin politician who has been a senator for the Cultural and Educational Panel since January 2025. She was previously a TD for Cavan–Monaghan from 2020 to 2024. She was a member of Cavan County Council for the Ballyjamesduff local electoral area from the 1999 election until 2012.

== Early life ==
Tully grew up on a farm in Kilnaleck, County Cavan, where she still lives. She is the second-youngest of a family of ten, and her father had been involved in the Irish republican movement since the 1950s. Several of her family members were Sinn Féin members during the 1970s and 1980s, and she has said that growing up in a border county made her conscious from an early age of the discrimination faced by the nationalist community in Northern Ireland. She has said that the 1981 H-Block hunger strikes had a profound effect on her as a child, and her family was involved in the campaign to elect Kieran Doherty as an Anti H-Block TD for Cavan-Monaghan.

Tully studied at University College Dublin before working as a teacher of history and maths. She taught history at Breifne College. She joined Sinn Féin in 1997 after becoming involved in the campaign to elect Caoimhghín Ó Caoláin, the first Sinn Féin candidate to be elected to the Dáil since 1957.

== Political career ==
Tully stood for Cavan County Council in the 1999 local elections and was elected for the Ballyjamesduff local electoral area, a seat she held for almost thirteen years. Her name was Pauline Tully-McAuley on the 2004 and 2009 election ballot papers. Her husband was released from prison in August 2009, and she resigned as councillor in 2012 due to the demands of her teaching job and childcare. She has since said that her husband's violence was also a factor in her decision to step back from politics at that time.

Tully was elected to the Dáil at the 2020 Irish general election, taking a second seat for Sinn Féin in Cavan-Monaghan alongside Matt Carthy after attracting around 10,000 first preference votes. As a TD she was a member of the Joint Committee on Disability Matters and of the Joint Committee on Autism, which produced a report containing 109 recommendations aimed at improving inclusivity for autistic people. She was also a member of a cross-party parliamentary group set up to monitor the implementation of those recommendations, an effort which included Leinster House becoming an autism-friendly parliament in December 2023.

She lost her seat at the 2024 general election, part of an unsuccessful attempt by Sinn Féin to win three of the five seats in Cavan-Monaghan; she has described herself as "devastated" by the result. She was elected as a Senator for the Cultural and Educational Panel in January 2025.

== Political positions ==
Ahead of the 2024 general election, Tully described her position on the political spectrum as left of centre, and named disability and carers as her main campaigning issue. On disability policy, she said that Sinn Féin would seek to modernise and strengthen the Disability Act 2005 and bring it into line with the Convention on the Rights of Persons with Disabilities, alongside increased funding for disability services and supports. Asked to rank her policy priorities, she placed housing first, followed by health, education, job creation, policing, roads, and defence.

On foreign policy, Tully said that Ireland and the wider international community should impose sanctions on Israel in response to its actions following the October 7 attacks in the Gaza war. On climate and biodiversity, she called for measures such as a pollution tax on private jets, reform of the Public Service Obligation levy to a more progressive basis, and resourcing of a National Just Transition Fund, while cautioning against what she termed "eco-austerity". She also expressed support for state-run childcare provision and better pay for early years professionals, as well as reform of planning law to tackle vacancy and dereliction in towns and villages. On immigration, she said that existing pressures stemmed from the under-resourcing of communities in which refugees are placed, rather than from the numbers arriving.

== Personal life ==
In 2000, while a member of Cavan County Council, Tully visited IRA prisoners at Castlerea Prison, where she met Pearse McAuley. McAuley had previously been part of an IRA plot to assassinate a prominent businessman and had escaped from Brixton Prison in 1991 along with Nessan Quinlivan; in 1999 he was sentenced to fourteen years' imprisonment for manslaughter over the killing of Jerry McCabe. In 2003 Tully married McAuley; at the time he was imprisoned for the killing of Jerry McCabe, and was granted day release for the wedding. The couple had two sons, Pearse (born 2007) and Eoghan (born 2010).

Tully has said that her husband's drinking, controlling behaviour, and occasional violence became a problem in the marriage, and that concerns about his character predated his release from prison in 2009. She and McAuley separated in February 2014, following an incident earlier that year, and she obtained a barring order and applied for judicial separation. On Christmas Eve 2014 he stabbed her 13 times in front of their two children, for which he was imprisoned until June 2022. She was taken to hospital and spent time in intensive care, having sustained injuries that caused both of her lungs to fill with blood, though no vital organs were punctured. McAuley was subsequently sentenced to eight years in prison for the attack. In her victim impact statement, Tully said that she would "live a life haunted by what happened to me". She received counselling from a domestic violence service in Cavan-Monaghan, which she has said she found beneficial to her recovery.

McAuley was released from prison in June 2022 and later moved to Strabane, County Tyrone; he died in 2024 at the age of 59. Tully has said that his death brought her a sense of relief, given that he could no longer cause her or their sons harm.

Dáil	Election	Deputy (Party)	Deputy (Party)	Deputy (Party)	Deputy (Party)	Deputy (Party)
21st	1977	Jimmy Leonard (FF)	John Wilson (FF)	Thomas J. Fitzpatrick (FG)	Rory O'Hanlon (FF)	John Conlan (FG)
22nd	1981	Kieran Doherty (AHB)	John Wilson (FF)	Thomas J. Fitzpatrick (FG)	Rory O'Hanlon (FF)	John Conlan (FG)
23rd	1982 (Feb)	Jimmy Leonard (FF)	John Wilson (FF)	Thomas J. Fitzpatrick (FG)	Rory O'Hanlon (FF)	John Conlan (FG)
24th	1982 (Nov)	Jimmy Leonard (FF)	John Wilson (FF)	Thomas J. Fitzpatrick (FG)	Rory O'Hanlon (FF)	John Conlan (FG)
25th	1987	Jimmy Leonard (FF)	John Wilson (FF)	Thomas J. Fitzpatrick (FG)	Rory O'Hanlon (FF)	Andrew Boylan (FG)
26th	1989	Jimmy Leonard (FF)	John Wilson (FF)	Bill Cotter (FG)	Rory O'Hanlon (FF)	Andrew Boylan (FG)
27th	1992	Jimmy Leonard (FF)	Brendan Smith (FF)	Seymour Crawford (FG)	Rory O'Hanlon (FF)	Andrew Boylan (FG)
28th	1997	Caoimhghín Ó Caoláin (SF)	Brendan Smith (FF)	Seymour Crawford (FG)	Rory O'Hanlon (FF)	Andrew Boylan (FG)
29th	2002	Caoimhghín Ó Caoláin (SF)	Brendan Smith (FF)	Seymour Crawford (FG)	Rory O'Hanlon (FF)	Paudge Connolly (Ind.)
30th	2007	Caoimhghín Ó Caoláin (SF)	Brendan Smith (FF)	Seymour Crawford (FG)	Rory O'Hanlon (FF)	Margaret Conlon (FF)
31st	2011	Caoimhghín Ó Caoláin (SF)	Brendan Smith (FF)	Heather Humphreys (FG)	Joe O'Reilly (FG)	Seán Conlan (FG)
32nd	2016	Caoimhghín Ó Caoláin (SF)	Brendan Smith (FF)	Heather Humphreys (FG)	Niamh Smyth (FF)	4 seats 2016–2020
33rd	2020	Matt Carthy (SF)	Brendan Smith (FF)	Heather Humphreys (FG)	Niamh Smyth (FF)	Pauline Tully (SF)
34th	2024	Matt Carthy (SF)	Brendan Smith (FF)	David Maxwell (FG)	Niamh Smyth (FF)	Cathy Bennett (SF)
