= 1991 Cavan County Council election =

Part of the 1991 Irish local elections

← 1985	27 June 1991	1999 →

All 25 seats on Cavan County Council
	First party	Second party	Third party
Party	Fianna Fáil	Fine Gael	Cavan Road Action Group
Seats won	11	9	4
Seat change	-3	-1	+4
	Fourth party
Party	Independent
Seats won	1
Seat change	0
- Map showing the area of Cavan County Council
Council control after election
TBD

An election to Cavan County Council took place on 27 June 1991 as part of that year's Irish local elections. 25 councillors were elected from four local electoral areas (LEAs) for a five-year term of office on the electoral system of proportional representation by means of the single transferable vote (PR-STV). This term was extended twice, first to 1998, then to 1999.

The Cavan Road Action Group won four seats; not a registered political party, it was a single-issue pressure group focused on the poor state of the surfaces of Cavan's local roads.

== Results by party ==
Party	Seats	±	First Pref. votes	FPv%	±%
Fianna Fáil	11	-3	11,312	42.8	-10.73
Fine Gael	9	-1	9,393	35.5	-0.86
Cavan Road Action Group	4	+4	3,694	14.0	New
Independent	1	0	1,045	3.9	-3.96
Totals	25	0	26,456	100.0	—

== Results by local electoral area ==
=== Bailieborough ===
Bailieborough - 7 seats
Party	Candidate	FPv%	Count								
Party	Candidate	FPv%	1	2	3	4	5	6	7	8	9
Cavan Road Action Group	Winston Turner	12.8%	958								
Fine Gael	Aidan Boyle	11.6%	863	866	895	896	1,121				
Fianna Fáil	Michael Giles*	11.4%	850	852	861	862	871	877	880	1,028	
Fianna Fáil	Clifford Kelly*	11.4%	848	849	940						
Fine Gael	Timothy Ryan*	10%	746	751	890	892	1,054				
Independent	May Coleman	9.2%	683	688	710	710	741	831	884	916	925
Fianna Fáil	Michael Smith*	7.8%	579	581	588	589	614	631	634	803	863
Fianna Fáil	Turlough Smith*	7.4%	551	553	558	558	584	594	604	712	738
Fianna Fáil	Francis McDermott	7.0%	525	527	537	538	574	586	600		
Fine Gael	Denis Reynolds*	5.8%	434	436	535	536					
Fine Gael	Jim Patterson	5.7%	424	425							
Electorate: 11,113 Valid: 7,461 (67.14%) Spoilt: 83 Quota: 933 Turnout: 7,544 (67.88%)

=== Ballyjamesduff ===
Ballyjamesduff - 6 seats
Party	Candidate	FPv%	Count				
Party	Candidate	FPv%	1	2	3	4	5
Fine Gael	Paddy O'Reilly*	14.4	876				
Fine Gael	Dessie Boylan*	11.7	711	994			
Fianna Fáil	Danny Brady*	11.3	690	702	703	939	
Fine Gael	Philip Miney*	11%	669	726	812	858	864
Cavan Road Action Group	Seamus Harten	10.9	664	732	752	877	
Fianna Fáil	Francie Fitzsimons	10.7	654	717	727	830	872
Fianna Fáil	Aidan O'Dwyer	10.6	647	676	678	779	799
Fianna Fáil	Patsy Sheridan	10.4	633	652	656		
Fine Gael	Robert Faussett*	9%	547				
Electorate: 9,442 Valid: 6,091 (64.51%) Spoilt: 66 Quota: 871 Turnout: 6,157 (65.21%)

=== Belturbet ===
Belturbet - 5 seats
Party	Candidate	FPv%	Count						
Party	Candidate	FPv%	1	2	3	4	5	6	7
Cavan Road Action Group	Matthew Fitzpatrick	19.5	1,071						
Fianna Fáil	Seán Smith*	16.1	885	898	969				
Fianna Fáil	Eddie Feeley*	12.7	696	700	709	729	737	835	858
Fianna Fáil	Anthony Vesey*	10.7	588	615	658	730	763	851	1,009
Fine Gael	Maura Maguire*	10.3	564	591	646	713	722	757	860
Fine Gael	Eamon Dolan*	7.9	432	448	450	463	464	525	652
Sinn Féin	Peadar Neary	7.3	400	417	422	441	443		
Fine Gael	Seamus Fitzpatrick	7.1	392	425	438	466	467	493	
Independent	May Smith	4.7	256	267	278				
Fianna Fáil	Pat Tiernan	3.7	204	212					
Electorate: 7,763 Valid: 5,488 (70.69%) Spoilt: 49 Quota: 915 Turnout: 5,537 (71.33%)

=== Cavan ===
Cavan - 7 seats
Party	Candidate	FPv%	Count								
Party	Candidate	FPv%	1	2	3	4	5	6	7	8	9
Cavan Road Action Group	Dolores Smith	13.5	1,001								
Fine Gael	Andrew Boylan TD*	12.1	895	906	918	937					
Fianna Fáil	Gerry Murray*	12%	891	905	912	957					
Fine Gael	Andrew O'Brien	9%	670	676	688	712	713	768	806	1,034	
Fianna Fáil	T.P. Smith*	8.8%	654	659	673	720	725	753	800	829	841
Fine Gael	Paddy O'Reilly	8.6%	641	645	651	669	669	742	788	953	
Fianna Fáil	Diarmuid Wilson	7.5%	553	557	582	606	611	648	699	737	745
Fine Gael	Senator Joe O'Reilly*	7.1%	529	541	543	569	572	614	631		
Fianna Fáil	Patrick Conaty*	6.7%	497	501	510	528	532	578	777	815	831
Fianna Fáil	Breda Elliot	4.9%	367	368	372	381	391	422			
Labour	Paul Dolan	4.3%	320	324	333	379	380				
Sinn Féin	Joe Ennis	3.9%	292	296	302						
Independent	Mary Smith	1.4	106	110							
Electorate: 9,442 Valid: 6,091 (64.5%) Spoilt: 66 Quota: 871 Turnout: 6,157 (65.21%)
