= 1999 Cavan County Council election =

Part of the 1999 Irish local elections

← 1991	10 June 1999	2004 →

All 25 seats on Cavan County Council
	First party	Second party	Third party
Party	Fianna Fáil	Fine Gael	Sinn Féin
Seats won	13	9	2
Seat change	+2	-	+2
	Fourth party
Party	Independent
Seats won	1
Seat change	-4
- Map showing the area of Cavan County Council
Council control after election
Fianna Fail

An election to Cavan County Council took place on 10 June 1999 as part of that year's Irish local elections. 25 councillors were elected from four local electoral areas by PR-STV voting for a five-year term of office.

== Results by party ==
Party	Seats	±	First Pref. votes	FPv%	±%
Fianna Fáil	13	+2	12,476	45.58	
Fine Gael	9	-	10,166	37.14	
Sinn Féin	2	+2	2,330	8.51	
Independent	1	-4	1,873	6.84	
Totals	25	-	27,369	100.00	—

== Results by local electoral area ==
=== Bailieborough ===
Bailieborough - 7 seats
Party	Candidate	FPv%	Count								
Party	Candidate	FPv%	1	2	3	4	5	6	7	8	9
Fine Gael	Joe O'Reilly*	15.81	1,264								
Fine Gael	Aidan Boyle*	14.32	1,145								
Fianna Fáil	Clifford Kelly*	12.34	987	991	995	1,116					
Fianna Fáil	Michael Giles*	10.49	839	867	875	893	900	997	1,079		
Sinn Féin	Paddy McDonald	7.98	632	656	667	701	711	763	792	798	804
Fianna Fáil	Francis McDermott	7.48	598	606	616	661	675	798	827	852	870
Independent	Winston Turner*	7.13	570	613	630	719	750	796	1,089		
Fianna Fáil	Turlough Smith	7.13	570	602	609	623	626	770	849	896	912
Independent	Fred Kettyle	7.00	560	601	608	635	642	653			
Fianna Fáil	Philomena Keenan	5.95	476	483	521	539	546				
Fine Gael	Johnny Sherlock	3.73	298	374	408						
Christian Solidarity	Damien Kivlehan	0.71	57	58	67						
Electorate: 12,368 Valid: 7,996 (64.65%) Spoilt: 108 Quota: 1,000 Turnout: 8,104 (65.52%)

=== Ballyjamesduff ===
Ballyjamesduff - 6 seats
Party	Candidate	FPv%	Count						
Party	Candidate	FPv%	1	2	3	4	5	6	7
Fine Gael	Paddy O'Reilly*	16.95	1,040						
Fianna Fáil	Danny Brady*	14.46	887						
Fianna Fáil	Francie Fitzsimons*	14.23	873	896					
Fine Gael	Dessie Boylan*	12.96	795	831	838	865	986		
Fine Gael	Robert Faussett	12.05	547	583	585	619	627	651	896
Sinn Féin	Pauline Tully	9.76	546	554	555	584	683	715	835
Fine Gael	Philip Miney*	7.97	489	505	505	516	536	557	
Fianna Fáil	Kate Soden	7.16	439	473	481	501	603	618	659
Fianna Fáil	Peter Galligan	5.98	367	371	371	376			
Christian Solidarity	Tony Smith	2.48	152	158	159				
Electorate: 10,390 Valid: 6,135 (59.05%) Spoilt: 136 Quota: 877 Turnout: 6,271 (60.36%)

=== Belturbet ===
Belturbet - 5 seats
Party	Candidate	FPv%	Count						
Party	Candidate	FPv%	1	2	3	4	5	6	7
Fianna Fáil	Seán Smith*	18.33	1,061						
Fianna Fáil	Eddie Feeley*	14.87	861	889	911	926	1,007		
Fine Gael	Peter McVitty	12.30	712	728	822	859	939	959	999
Fianna Fáil	Anthony Vesey*	11.09	642	660	667	765	856	865	1,077
Fine Gael	Maura Maguire-Lynch	10.40	602	608	651	715	741	744	925
Fianna Fáil	Cormac O'Donnell	8.81	510	521	525	542	576	585	
Fine Gael	Seamus Fitzpatrick	7.60	440	442	478	554	589	590	627
Sinn Féin	Peadar Neary	6.63	384	390	400	429			
Independent	Matthew Fitzpatrick*	6.06	351	353	365				
Fine Gael	Eamon Dolan	3.90	226	233					
Electorate: 8,363 Valid: 5,789 (69.22%) Spoilt: 80 Quota: 965 Turnout: 5,869 (70.18%)

=== Cavan ===
Cavan - 7 seats
Party	Candidate	FPv%	Count							
Party	Candidate	FPv%	1	2	3	4	5	6	7	8
Fianna Fáil	Diarmuid Wilson	15.28	1,138							
Fine Gael	Andrew Boylan*	12.93	963							
Fine Gael	Madeleine Argue	11.76	876	894	903	917	947			
Sinn Féin	Charlie Boylan	14.67	768	783	785	800	815	817	834	
Fianna Fáil	Patrick Conaty*	10.24	763	815	818	832	877	880	899	971
Fianna Fáil	T.P. Smith*	9.88	736	797	800	812	821	822	829	879
Fianna Fáil	Gerry Murray*	9.79	729	742	743	747	751	751	802	921
Fine Gael	Paddy O'Reilly*	6.99	521	543	550	565	601	605	717	795
Independent	Dolores Smith*	5.26	392	403	404	441	474	476	514	
Fine Gael	Jim Courtney	3.33	248	250	253	253	259	262		
Labour	Des Cullen	2.38	177	184	185	203				
Green	Mary McAdam	1.85	138	143	144					
Electorate: 13,204 Valid: 7,449 (56.41%) Spoilt: 125 Quota: 932 Turnout: 7,574 (57.36%)
