= 1985 Cavan County Council election =

Part of the 1985 Irish local elections

← 1979	20 June 1985	1991 →

All 25 seats on Cavan County Council
	First party	Second party	Third party
Party	Fianna Fáil	Fine Gael	Independent
Seats won	14	10	1
Seat change	+2	-1	-
	Fourth party
Party	Sinn Féin
Seats won	0
Seat change	-1
- Map showing the area of Cavan County Council
Council control after election
Fianna Fail

An election to all 25 seats on Cavan County Council took place on 20 June 1985 as part of that year's Irish local elections. Councillors were elected from four local electoral areas (LEAs) for a five-year term of office on the electoral system of proportional representation by means of the single transferable vote (PR-STV). This term was extended for a further year, to 1991.

== Results by party ==
Party	Seats	±	First Pref. votes	FPv%	±%
Fianna Fáil	14	+2	14,750	53.53	
Fine Gael	10	-1	10,019	36.36	
Independent	1	-	2,167	7.86	
Sinn Féin	0	-1	620	2.25	
Totals	25	-	27,556	100.00	—

== Results by local electoral area ==
=== Bailieborough ===
Bailieborough: 7 seats
Party	Candidate	FPv%	Count						
Party	Candidate	FPv%	1	2	3	4	5	6	7
Fianna Fáil	Michael Giles	16.79%	1,260						
Fianna Fáil	Michael Smith	13.47%	1,011						
Fianna Fáil	Clifford Kelly	11.55%	867	934	940				
Independent	David Coleman	10.46%	785	800	802	824	854	926	948
Fianna Fáil	Turlough Smith	9.04%	678	780	815	827	855	873	888
Fianna Fáil	Francis McDermott	8.94%	671	742	754	784	806	830	843
Fine Gael	Denis Reynolds	8.57%	643	648	655	753	1,054		
Fine Gael	Gerald Lynch	8.06%	605	651	652	822	1,005		
Fine Gael	Mona Hoban	6.81%	511	517	525	623			
Fine Gael	Justin Mackin	6.3%	473	482	483				
Electorate: 10,982 Valid: 7,504 (68.33%) Quota: 939

=== Ballyjamesduff ===
Ballyjamesduff: 6 seats
Party	Candidate	FPv%	Count							
Party	Candidate	FPv%	1	2	3	4	5	6	7	8
Fianna Fáil	Danny Brady	15.72%	1023							
Fianna Fáil	John Lovett	12.4%	807	860	922	1124				
Fine Gael	Robert Fausset	10.93%	711	712	719	763	778	951		
Fine Gael	Dessie Boylan	10.71%	697	699	711	822	877	1157		
Fine Gael	Paddy O'Reilly Jr.	10.4%	677	678	701	724	728	832	1036	
Fianna Fáil	Seamus Lynch	9.93%	646	653	682	694	730	770	784	809
Fianna Fáil	Michael McGinn	9.67%	629	634	657	677	708	721	730	739
Fine Gael	Andy Cullen	9.02%	587	606	630	680	693			
Independent	Patrick Reilly	6.98%	454	457	519					
Independent	Joe Ennis	4.26%	277	279						
Electorate: 9,252 Valid: 6,508 (70.34%) Quota: 930

=== Belturbet ===
Belturbet: 5 seats
Party	Candidate	FPv%	Count						
Party	Candidate	FPv%	1	2	3	4	5	6	7
Fianna Fáil	Anthony P. Vesey	19.49%	1167						
Fianna Fáil	Sean Smith	17.18%	1029						
Fine Gael	Joseph A. Maguire	13.88%	831	841	843	846	908	984	1041
Fine Gael	Eamonn Dolan	10.99%	658	666	671	674	748	949	1020
Fianna Fáil	Eddie Feeley	10.1%	605	626	632	703	706	796	893
Fianna Fáil	Seamus Dolan	8.4%	503	578	590	596	621	653	775
Sinn Féin	Peadar Neary	6.71%	402	427	430	552	562	572	
Fine Gael	Desmond "Demmy" McGovern	5.91%	354	357	358	371	425		
Fine Gael	Teddy Emery	3.71%	222	247	247				
Sinn Féin	Peter McGovern	3.64%	218	219	2220				
Electorate: 7,938 Valid: 5,989 (75.45%) Quota: 999

=== Cavan ===
Cavan: 7 seats
Party	Candidate	FPv%	Count					
Party	Candidate	FPv%	1	2	3	4	5	6
Fianna Fáil	Veronica Sharkey	14.1%	1065					
Fianna Fáil	Gerry Murray	13.47%	1018					
Fine Gael	Andy O'Brien	12.03%	909	918	925	949		
Fine Gael	Andrew Boylan	11.13%	841	844	845	865	1110	
Fine Gael	Joe O'Reilly	9.98%	754	759	768	792	950	
Fianna Fáil	Francis Smith	9.17%	693	718	734	864	897	932
Fianna Fáil	Patrick Conaty	8.76%	662	704	734	877	958	
Independent	Charlie Boylan	8.62%	651	659	662	699	729	785
Fine Gael	Patrick O'Reilly	7.23%	546	552	553	588		
Fianna Fáil	Mary Smith	5.51%	416	435	444			
Electorate: 11,013 Valid: 7,555 (68.6%) Quota: 945
