= Sarah O'Reilly =

Irish politician

Senator Sarah O'Reilly
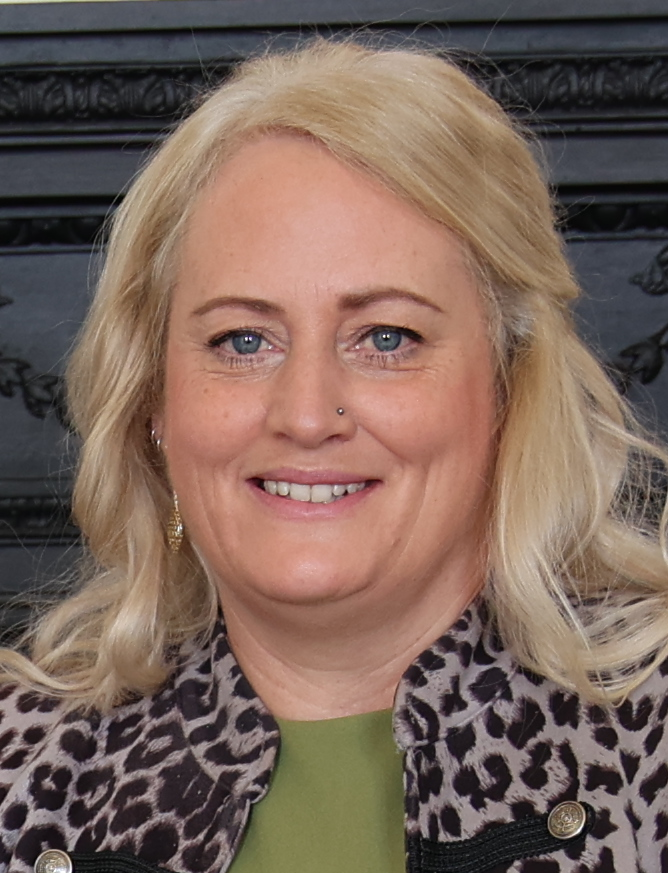
- O'Reilly in 2025

Senator
- Incumbent
- Assumed office January 2025
- Constituency: Agricultural Panel

Personal details
- Born: 1975/1976 (age 50–51)
- Party: Aontú (since 2018)
- Other political affiliations: Fianna Fáil (2008–2018)

Sarah O'Reilly (born 1975/1976) is an Irish Aontú politician who has been a senator for the Agricultural Panel since January 2025.

== Early life ==
O'Reilly is from Bailieborough, County Cavan, and comes from a farming background. She left school at the age of 16 after the birth of her first child, and later returned to education to qualify as an accounting technician. She subsequently spent 18 years working as an agricultural contractor, carrying out ploughing, tilling and reseeding work for other farmers. After her contracting business closed during the economic downturn, she worked as an international buyer of parts for air tools used in diamond mines.

== Political career ==
O'Reilly's introduction to politics came through canvassing for Fianna Fáil TD Niamh Smyth, a neighbour of hers in Bailieborough. She was a member of Cavan County Council for the Bailieborough–Cootehill area from March 2016 to January 2025. She was co-opted onto the council in March 2016 as a Fianna Fáil member, replacing Smyth on her election to Dáil Eireann. She subsequently worked as an administrator for Fianna Fáil senator Robbie Gallagher, but left the role after she joined Aontú, saying she felt it presented a conflict of interest.

In December 2018, O'Reilly joined Aontú. She was re-elected to the council as an Aontú candidate in 2019 and 2024.

From 2020 to 2021, O'Reilly served as chairperson of Cavan County Council.

She was an unsuccessful candidate at the 2020 and 2024 general elections for the Cavan–Monaghan constituency. At the 2020 election, the constituency was enlarged from four seats to five, and O'Reilly was regarded as Aontú's best prospect of winning a second seat there, following the retirement of long-serving Sinn Féin TD Caoimhghín Ó Caoláin, whose party successor as candidate was its MEP Matt Carthy. During that campaign, O'Reilly described herself as "unashamedly pro-life", while noting that not everyone who voted for her held the same view.

As a senator, O'Reilly has continued to campaign on anti-abortion issues. In May 2025, she addressed the annual "March for Life" rally in Dublin, telling those in attendance to keep "pressing forward without apology". She told the crowd the anti-abortion movement was "making progress" and called for the number of abortions carried out in the state to be reduced.

== Political views ==
O'Reilly has described herself as "unashamedly pro-life". Her political party, Aontú, is noted for having anti-abortion policies as core policy positions.

In a November 2024 interview, O'Reilly described Aontú as "a grassroots centre-left party" and "a pluralist, republican party." She named housing and planning, the cost of living, accountability, and health services, particularly mental health and disability supports, as her main campaigning issues.

On housing, she has called for the refurbishment of vacant local authority and privately-owned housing stock, and has criticised the state's use of private emergency accommodation providers for asylum seekers as a "grave injustice" to both local communities and those seeking help. She has also advocated for state supports to be directed towards small, independently-run childcare providers rather than larger commercial operators. On foreign policy, she has said she supports sanctions against Israel and the expulsion of the Israeli ambassador to Ireland "until there is peace in the area."

== Personal life ==
O'Reilly has four sons. As of 2020, all four had emigrated, three to Canada and one to Australia, after the family farm was sold.
