= Niamh Smyth =

Irish politician (born 1978)

Niamh Smyth TD
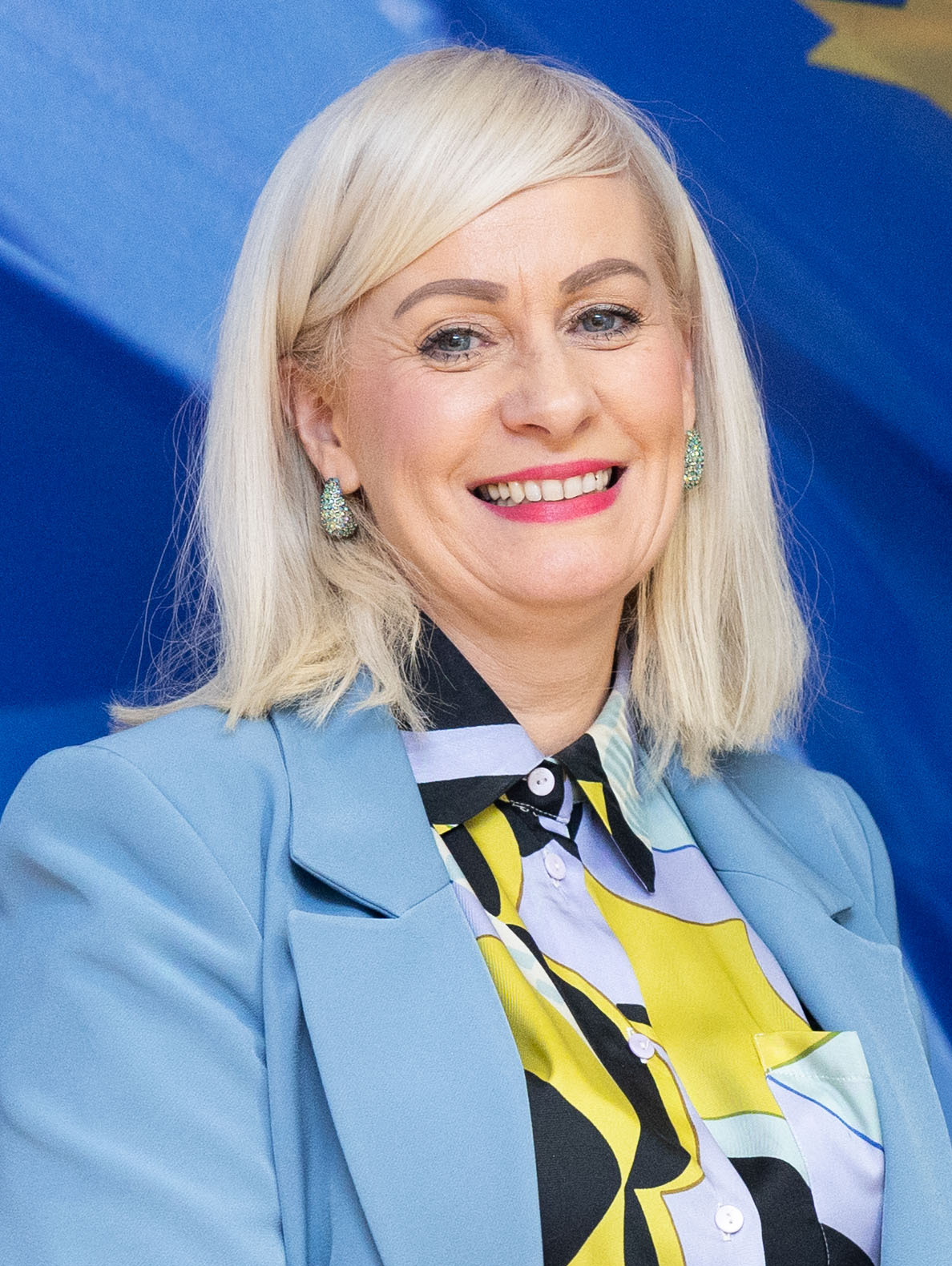
- Smyth in 2025

Minister of State
- 2025–: Enterprise, Tourism and Employment

Chair of the Committee on Media, Tourism, Arts, Culture, Sport and the Gaeltacht
- In office 15 September 2020 – 8 November 2024
- Preceded by: Catherine Connolly
- Succeeded by: TBA

Teachta Dála
- Incumbent
- Assumed office February 2016
- Constituency: Cavan–Monaghan

Personal details
- Born: 5 May 1978 (age 48) Cavan, Ireland
- Party: Fianna Fáil
- Spouse: James Conaty (m. 2011; sep. 2018)
- Relations: Patrick Smith (granduncle)
- Children: 1
- Education: NCAD; Dún Laoghaire Institute; University of Limerick
- Website: niamhsmyth.ie

Niamh Smyth (born 5 May 1978) is an Irish Fianna Fáil politician who has served as Minister of State at the Department of Enterprise, Tourism and Employment since January 2025 and a TD for Cavan–Monaghan since the 2016 general election. She served as the Chair of the Committee on Media, Tourism, Arts, Culture, Sport and the Gaeltacht from September 2020 until November 2024.

== Political career ==
She was a member of Cavan County Council from 2009 to 2016.

Smyth was elected as the first president of the Fianna Fáil women's network on 14 September 2015. In May 2016, she was appointed to the Fianna Fáil Front Bench as Spokesperson for the Arts and Heritage.

She was re-elected at the 2024 general election. On 29 January 2025, Smyth was appointed as Minister of State at the Department of Enterprise, Tourism and Employment with special responsibility for trade promotion, artificial intelligence and digital transformation.

== Personal and early life ==
Smyth was born to Dessie and Maura Smyth. Dessie is originally from Knockbride and is a nephew of Patrick Smith, who was a founding member of Fianna Fáil and a long-serving politician.

Smyth is married to James Conaty and they have one daughter together. They have been separated since 2018.

Political offices
Preceded by Dara Calleary	Minister of State at the Department of Enterprise, Tourism and Employment; 2025–present	Incumbent

Dáil	Election	Deputy (Party)	Deputy (Party)	Deputy (Party)	Deputy (Party)	Deputy (Party)
21st	1977	Jimmy Leonard (FF)	John Wilson (FF)	Thomas J. Fitzpatrick (FG)	Rory O'Hanlon (FF)	John Conlan (FG)
22nd	1981	Kieran Doherty (AHB)	John Wilson (FF)	Thomas J. Fitzpatrick (FG)	Rory O'Hanlon (FF)	John Conlan (FG)
23rd	1982 (Feb)	Jimmy Leonard (FF)	John Wilson (FF)	Thomas J. Fitzpatrick (FG)	Rory O'Hanlon (FF)	John Conlan (FG)
24th	1982 (Nov)	Jimmy Leonard (FF)	John Wilson (FF)	Thomas J. Fitzpatrick (FG)	Rory O'Hanlon (FF)	John Conlan (FG)
25th	1987	Jimmy Leonard (FF)	John Wilson (FF)	Thomas J. Fitzpatrick (FG)	Rory O'Hanlon (FF)	Andrew Boylan (FG)
26th	1989	Jimmy Leonard (FF)	John Wilson (FF)	Bill Cotter (FG)	Rory O'Hanlon (FF)	Andrew Boylan (FG)
27th	1992	Jimmy Leonard (FF)	Brendan Smith (FF)	Seymour Crawford (FG)	Rory O'Hanlon (FF)	Andrew Boylan (FG)
28th	1997	Caoimhghín Ó Caoláin (SF)	Brendan Smith (FF)	Seymour Crawford (FG)	Rory O'Hanlon (FF)	Andrew Boylan (FG)
29th	2002	Caoimhghín Ó Caoláin (SF)	Brendan Smith (FF)	Seymour Crawford (FG)	Rory O'Hanlon (FF)	Paudge Connolly (Ind.)
30th	2007	Caoimhghín Ó Caoláin (SF)	Brendan Smith (FF)	Seymour Crawford (FG)	Rory O'Hanlon (FF)	Margaret Conlon (FF)
31st	2011	Caoimhghín Ó Caoláin (SF)	Brendan Smith (FF)	Heather Humphreys (FG)	Joe O'Reilly (FG)	Seán Conlan (FG)
32nd	2016	Caoimhghín Ó Caoláin (SF)	Brendan Smith (FF)	Heather Humphreys (FG)	Niamh Smyth (FF)	4 seats 2016–2020
33rd	2020	Matt Carthy (SF)	Brendan Smith (FF)	Heather Humphreys (FG)	Niamh Smyth (FF)	Pauline Tully (SF)
34th	2024	Matt Carthy (SF)	Brendan Smith (FF)	David Maxwell (FG)	Niamh Smyth (FF)	Cathy Bennett (SF)
