= Cavan County Council =

Local authority of County Cavan, Ireland

Cavan County Council Comhairle Contae an Chabháin

Type
- Type: County council

History
- Founded: 1 April 1899

Leadership
- Cathaoirleach: Carmel Brady, FG

Structure
- Seats: 18
- Political groups: Fianna Fáil (6) Fine Gael (6) Sinn Féin (3) Aontú (1) Independent Ireland (1) Independent (1)

Elections
- Last election: 7 June 2024

Motto
- Irish: Feardhacht is Fírinne "Manliness and Truth"

Meeting place
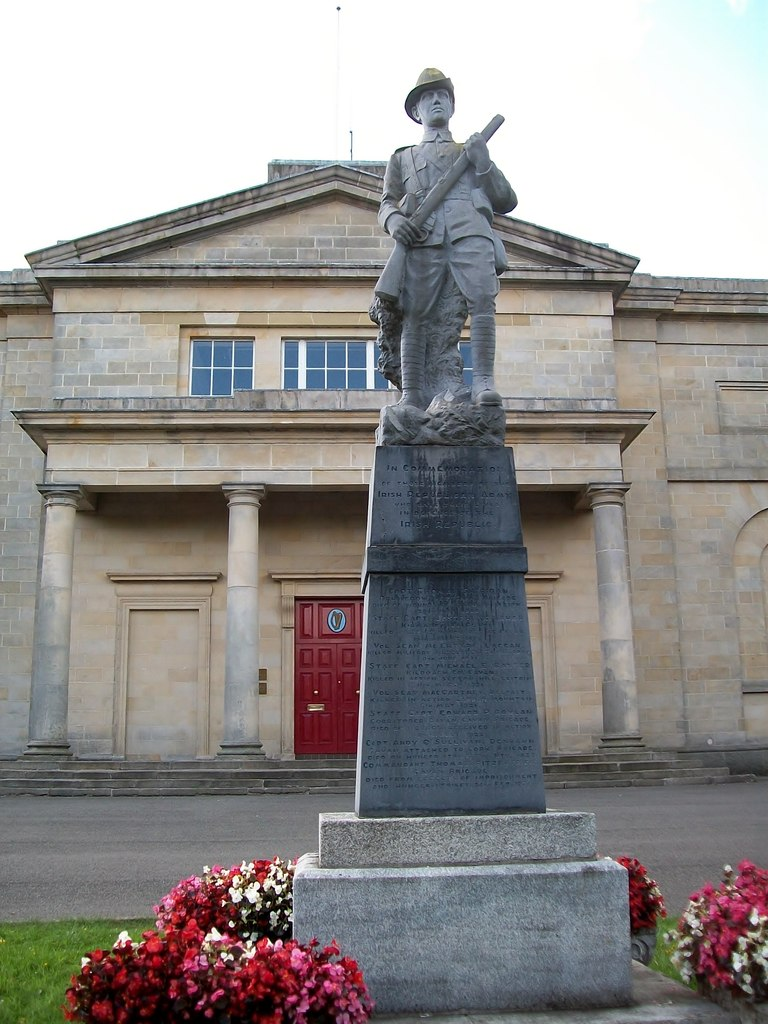
- Cavan Courthouse, Cavan

Website
- Official website

Cavan County Council (Irish: Comhairle Contae an Chabháin) is the authority responsible for local government in County Cavan, Ireland. As a county council, it is governed by the Local Government Act 2001. The council is responsible for housing and community, roads and transportation, urban planning and development, amenity and culture, and environment. The council has 18 elected members. Elections are held every five years and are by single transferable vote. The head of the council has the title of Cathaoirleach (chairperson). The county administration is headed by a chief executive, Eoin Doyle. The county town is Cavan.

== History ==
The meeting place of Cavan County Council has always been at Cavan Courthouse.

Cavan County Council was established on 1 April 1899 under the Local Government (Ireland) Act 1898 for the administrative county of County Cavan, succeeding the former judicial county of Cavan.

Before 1925, the chair of each rural district council sat as an ex officio member of the council. Under the Local Government Act 1925, rural district councils in Ireland were abolished and their functions transferred to the county councils. In County Cavan, these were the districts of Bailieborough, Bawnboy, Castlerahan, Cavan, Enniskillen No. 2, and Mullaghoran.

Under the Local Government Reform Act 2014, all town councils in Ireland were abolished and their functions transferred to the county councils. In County Cavan, these were the town councils of Belturbet, Cavan, and Cootehill. It also provided that the county be divided into municipal districts to administer council business at a local level.

== Regional Assembly ==
Cavan County Council has two representatives on the Northern and Western Regional Assembly where they are part of the Border Strategic Planning Area Committee.

== Elections ==
The Local Government (Ireland) Act 1919 introduced the electoral system of proportional representation by means of the single transferable vote (PR-STV) for the 1920 local elections. County Cavan was divided into 4 county electoral areas to elect the 20 members of the council. Following the changes under the Local Government Act 1925, this number was increased to 32. In 1942, in an order under the Local Government Act 1941, the council was reduced to 25. This figure was restated by the Local Government Act 2001.

In 2013, a Local Electoral Area Boundary Committee recommended a reduction in the number of seats to 18. This was implemented by the Local Government Reform Act 2014.

Year	FF	FG	SF	Lab	Aon	II	CnaP	CnaT	CPA	FP	NL	CnaG	Rep	UTA	SF (pre-1922)	U	IrishNat	Ind.	Total
2024	6	6	3	0	1	1	—N/a	—N/a	0	—N/a	—N/a	—N/a	—N/a	—N/a	—N/a	0	—N/a	1	18
2019	8	7	1	0	1	—N/a	—N/a	—N/a	0	—N/a	—N/a	—N/a	—N/a	—N/a	—N/a	0	—N/a	1	18
2014	7	7	4	0	—N/a	—N/a	—N/a	—N/a	0	—N/a	—N/a	—N/a	—N/a	—N/a	—N/a	0	—N/a	0	18
2009	8	13	4	0	—N/a	—N/a	—N/a	—N/a	0	—N/a	—N/a	—N/a	—N/a	—N/a	—N/a	0	—N/a	0	25
2004	11	11	3	0	—N/a	—N/a	—N/a	—N/a	0	—N/a	—N/a	—N/a	—N/a	—N/a	—N/a	0	—N/a	0	25
1999	13	9	2	0	—N/a	—N/a	—N/a	—N/a	0	—N/a	—N/a	—N/a	—N/a	—N/a	—N/a	0	—N/a	1	25
1991	11	9	0	0	—N/a	—N/a	—N/a	—N/a	0	—N/a	—N/a	—N/a	—N/a	—N/a	—N/a	0	—N/a	5	25
1985	14	10	0	0	—N/a	—N/a	—N/a	—N/a	0	—N/a	—N/a	—N/a	—N/a	—N/a	—N/a	0	—N/a	1	25
1979	12	11	1	0	—N/a	—N/a	—N/a	—N/a	0	—N/a	—N/a	—N/a	—N/a	—N/a	—N/a	0	—N/a	1	25
1974	12	10	1	0	—N/a	—N/a	—N/a	—N/a	0	—N/a	—N/a	—N/a	—N/a	—N/a	—N/a	0	—N/a	2	25
1967	11	10	0	0	—N/a	—N/a	—N/a	—N/a	0	—N/a	—N/a	—N/a	—N/a	—N/a	—N/a	0	—N/a	3	25
1960	11	6	1	0	—N/a	—N/a	2	0	0	—N/a	—N/a	—N/a	—N/a	—N/a	—N/a	0	—N/a	4	25
1955	11	8	0	0	—N/a	—N/a	2	0	0	—N/a	—N/a	—N/a	—N/a	—N/a	—N/a	0	—N/a	4	25
1950	13	5	0	0	—N/a	—N/a	2	1	0	—N/a	—N/a	—N/a	—N/a	—N/a	—N/a	0	—N/a	4	25
1945	11	0	0	0	—N/a	—N/a	—N/a	3	0	—N/a	—N/a	—N/a	—N/a	—N/a	—N/a	0	—N/a	11	25
1942	8	0	0	1	—N/a	—N/a	—N/a	3	0	—N/a	—N/a	—N/a	—N/a	—N/a	—N/a	0	—N/a	13	25
1934	14	13	0	0	—N/a	—N/a	—N/a	—N/a	0	—N/a	—N/a	—N/a	—N/a	—N/a	—N/a	0	—N/a	5	32
1928	10	—N/a	0	0	—N/a	—N/a	—N/a	—N/a	2	4	1	2	—N/a	—N/a	—N/a	0	—N/a	12	32
1925	—N/a	—N/a	—N/a	1	—N/a	—N/a	—N/a	—N/a	0	6	1	9	5	5	—N/a	0	—N/a	5	32
1920	—N/a	—N/a	—N/a	0	—N/a	—N/a	—N/a	—N/a	—N/a	—N/a	—N/a	—N/a	—N/a	—N/a	20	0	1	0	21
1914	—N/a	—N/a	—N/a		—N/a	—N/a	—N/a	—N/a	—N/a	—N/a	—N/a	—N/a	—N/a	—N/a					21
1911	—N/a	—N/a	—N/a		—N/a	—N/a	—N/a	—N/a	—N/a	—N/a	—N/a	—N/a	—N/a	—N/a					21
1908	—N/a	—N/a	—N/a		—N/a	—N/a	—N/a	—N/a	—N/a	—N/a	—N/a	—N/a	—N/a	—N/a					21
1905	—N/a	—N/a	—N/a		—N/a	—N/a	—N/a	—N/a	—N/a	—N/a	—N/a	—N/a	—N/a	—N/a					21
1902	—N/a	—N/a	—N/a		—N/a	—N/a	—N/a	—N/a	—N/a	—N/a	—N/a	—N/a	—N/a	—N/a	—N/a				21
1899	—N/a	—N/a	—N/a		—N/a	—N/a	—N/a	—N/a	—N/a	—N/a	—N/a	—N/a	—N/a	—N/a	—N/a	0	20	0	20

=== Local electoral areas and municipal districts ===
The area governed by the council

Since 2019, County Cavan has been divided into three local electoral areas (LEAs), defined by electoral divisions, each of which also forms a municipal district.

LEA/Municipal district	Definition	Seats
Bailieborough–Cootehill	Ashfield, Bailieborough, Ballyhaise, Canningstown, Carnagarve, Clonervy, Cootehill Rural, Cootehill Urban, Corraneary, Cuttragh, Drumanespick, Drumcarn, Drung, Enniskeen, Killinkere, Kingscourt, Knappagh, Larah North, Larah South, Lisagoan, Rakenny, Redhill, Shercock, Skeagh, Stradone, Taghart, Termon, Tullyvin East, Tullyvin West and Waterloo.	6
Ballyjamesduff	Arvagh, Ballintemple, Ballyjamesduff, Ballymachugh, Bellananagh, Bruce Hall, Castlerahan, Corr, Crossbane, Crossdoney, Crosskeys, Denn, Derrin, Drumcarban, Drumlumman, Graddum, Kilbride, Kilcogy, Kilgolagh, Kill, Kilnaleck, Loughdawan, Lurgan, Mullagh, Munterconnaught, Scrabby, Springfield and Virginia.	6
Cavan–Belturbet	Ardue, Ballyconnell, Ballymagauran, Bawnboy, Belturbet, Benbrack, Bilberry, Butlers Bridge, Carn, Carrafin, Castlesaunderson, Cavan Rural, Cavan Urban, Derrylahan, Derrynananta, Diamond, Doogary, Dowra, Dunmakeever, Eskey, Grilly, Kilconny, Killashandra, Killinagh, Killykeen, Kinawley, Lissanover, Milltown, Moynehall, Pedara Vohers, Swanlinbar, Teebane, Templeport, Tircahan and Tuam.	6

== Councillors ==
The following were elected at the 2024 Cavan County Council election.

Party	Seats
Fianna Fáil	6
Fine Gael	6
Sinn Féin	3
Aontú	1
Independent Ireland	1
Independent	1

=== Councillors by electoral area ===
Council members from 2024 election
Local electoral area	Name	Party
Bailieborough–Cootehill	Sarah O'Reilly (Note: Replaced during term, see table below for details.)	Aontú
Bailieborough–Cootehill	Carmel Brady	Fine Gael
Bailieborough–Cootehill	Stiofán Conaty	Sinn Féin
Bailieborough–Cootehill	Val Smith	Fine Gael
Bailieborough–Cootehill	Clifford Kelly	Fianna Fáil
Bailieborough–Cootehill	Niall Smith	Fianna Fáil
Ballyjamesduff	Shane P. O'Reilly	Independent Ireland
Ballyjamesduff	Trevor Smith	Fine Gael
Ballyjamesduff	Winston Bennet	Fine Gael
Ballyjamesduff	Phillip Brady	Fianna Fáil
Ballyjamesduff	T. P. O'Reilly	Fine Gael
Ballyjamesduff	Noel Connell	Sinn Féin
Cavan–Belturbet	Áine Smith	Fianna Fáil
Cavan–Belturbet	Brendan Fay	Independent
Cavan–Belturbet	Damien Brady	Sinn Féin
Cavan–Belturbet	John Paul Feeley	Fianna Fáil
Cavan–Belturbet	Niamh Brady	Fine Gael
Cavan–Belturbet	Patricia Walsh	Fianna Fáil

==== Co-options ====
Party	Outgoing	LEA	Reason	Date	Co-optee
Aontú	Sarah O'Reilly	Bailieborough–Cootehill	Elected to 27th Seanad at the 2025 Seanad election	28 March 2025	Adrian Rogers
