= Aontú =

Irish political party

- Leader: Peadar Tóibín
- Deputy leader: Gemma Brolly
- Founded: 28 January 2019; 7 years ago
- Split from: Sinn Féin
- Headquarters: 8 Market Square, Navan, County Meath
- Youth wing: Ógra Aontú
- Membership (2026): 2,500
- Ideology: Irish republicanism; Social conservatism; Populism; Euroscepticism
- Political position: Fiscal: Left-wing; Social: Right-wing
- Colours: Green
- Slogan: Life; Unity; Economic Justice
- Dáil Éireann: 2 / 174
- Seanad Éireann: 1 / 60
- Local government in the Republic of Ireland: 10 / 949
- Local government in Northern Ireland: 1 / 462

Website
- aontu.ie

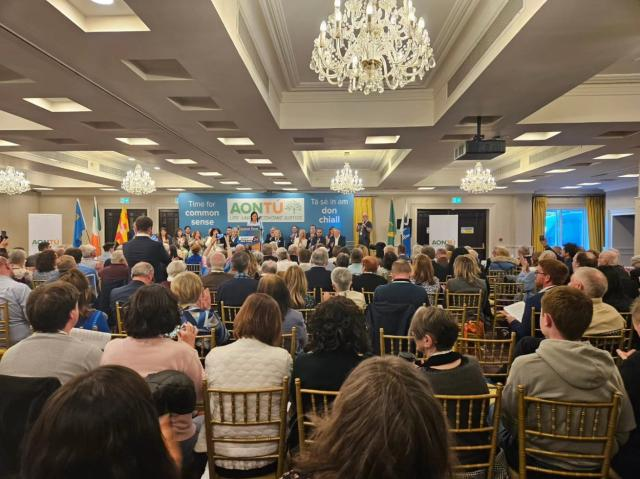
Aontú's 2024 Ardfheis in County Kildare

Aontú (Irish: [ˈeːn̪ˠt̪ˠuː]; "Unity") (Note: The Irish word aontú is the verbal noun of aontaigh, meaning "unite", "agree", "assent". The logo also colours the letters tú separately, forming the Irish word for "you" (singular). Party founder Peadar Tóibín when announcing its name said it means "unity and consent".) is a conservative Irish republican political party active in both the Republic of Ireland and Northern Ireland. It has been led by Peadar Tóibín since its foundation in January 2019. The party holds socially conservative positions, with a significant policy being opposition to abortion, and is left-wing on economic issues. Political observers have variously characterised Aontú as centre-left, right-wing, or populist. As of August 2026, the party reportedly had 2,500 members.

== History ==
The party was founded by Peadar Tóibín, a TD who resigned from Sinn Féin on 15 November 2018 due to his anti-abortion views after opposing the party whip on the Health (Regulation of Termination of Pregnancy) Act 2018. Tóibín began canvassing elected representatives, securing support within a week from two local councillors in the Republic. Tóibín held meetings across the island of Ireland addressing interested potential members. The first Northern Ireland local councillor declared on 7 January 2019. As of 28 January 2019 eight councillors had joined. A second councillor in Northern Ireland joined on 26 February 2019.

The name "Aontú" was announced at a meeting in Belfast on 28 January 2019. The Meath Chronicle said that the announcement of the name was precipitated by its unexpected publication on the UK Electoral Commission website. Tóibín said the party had sought registration in both jurisdictions, that "Aontú obviously means unity and our major objective is the unity of Irish people north and south". He recalled that Belfast was the birthplace of the United Irishmen of 1798. Aontú would "seek to build an all-Ireland economy to mitigate the worst effects of Brexit, economic justice for all and to protect the right to life". Tóibín said he was talking with Sinn Féin, SDLP, and independent representatives in Northern Ireland, and that "people from Sinn Féin, SDLP and Fianna Fáil backgrounds would feel comfortable" in the party.

Following its foundation in January of that year, Aontú contested the Northern Ireland local elections in May 2019. The party, which nominated 16 candidates, won one seat on Derry and Strabane Council, with its two outgoing councillors losing their seats. Several months after the election, a councillor for the SDLP in Mid Ulster joined Aontú. Later in May 2019, the party put forward 53 candidates in the 2019 local elections in the Republic Ireland, including its seven sitting councillors. Three were elected. Of the four Dáil by-elections held in November 2019, Aontú contested two. Finian Toomey came 7th in the 2019 Cork North-Central by-election with 1,008 votes (3.9%), and Jim Codd came 6th in the 2019 Wexford by-election with 2,102 votes (5.2%). Aontú contested seven seats in the 2019 United Kingdom general election in Northern Ireland. The party, which received 9,814 votes (1.2%), won none of these seats.

Aontú fielded 25 candidates in the 2020 Irish general election, including leader Peadar Tóibín (Meath West), deputy leader Anne McCloskey (Sligo-Leitrim) and a number of sitting local councillors. Tóibín was the only successful candidate. As Tóibín was not invited to participate in a televised debate alongside the leaders of other parties, the party threatened a High Court action against RTÉ. The party, however, did not proceed with the action noting that there "was not enough time to have the action heard" before the debate. In the 2020 Seanad election, Paul Lawless contested the Cultural and Educational Panel receiving 2.6% of votes.

In September 2020, Aontú's then deputy leader Anne McCloskey came under criticism for her comments about the effectiveness of masks during the COVID-19 pandemic, with party leader Peadar Tóibín defending her right to her view on the topic. McCloskey stepped down as a councillor in October 2020, and was replaced by party member Emmet Doyle. She was replaced as deputy leader by Denise Mullen. At the 2022 Ard Fheis, Mullen stepped down from the position of deputy leader and was replaced by Gemma Brolly, Aontú candidate for East Londonderry at the May 2022 Assembly election.

In November 2020, the Standards in Public Office Commission announced that Aontú were one of five political parties who failed to provide them with a set of audited accounts for 2019, in breach of statutory obligations. In response, Aontú released a statement claiming that they had submitted the account statements and apologising for the delay, citing the COVID-19 pandemic.

Mairéad Tóibín unsuccessfully contested the 2021 Dublin Bay South by-election, coming ninth with 740 first preference votes (2.8%).

Aontú fielded 12 candidates in the 2022 Northern Ireland Assembly election. None of its candidates were elected, with the party coming in eighth place with 12,777 first preference votes (1.5%). The party also contested the 2023 Northern Ireland local elections. None of Aontú's 19 candidates were elected, with their incumbent councillor in Derry City and Strabane District Council losing his seat.

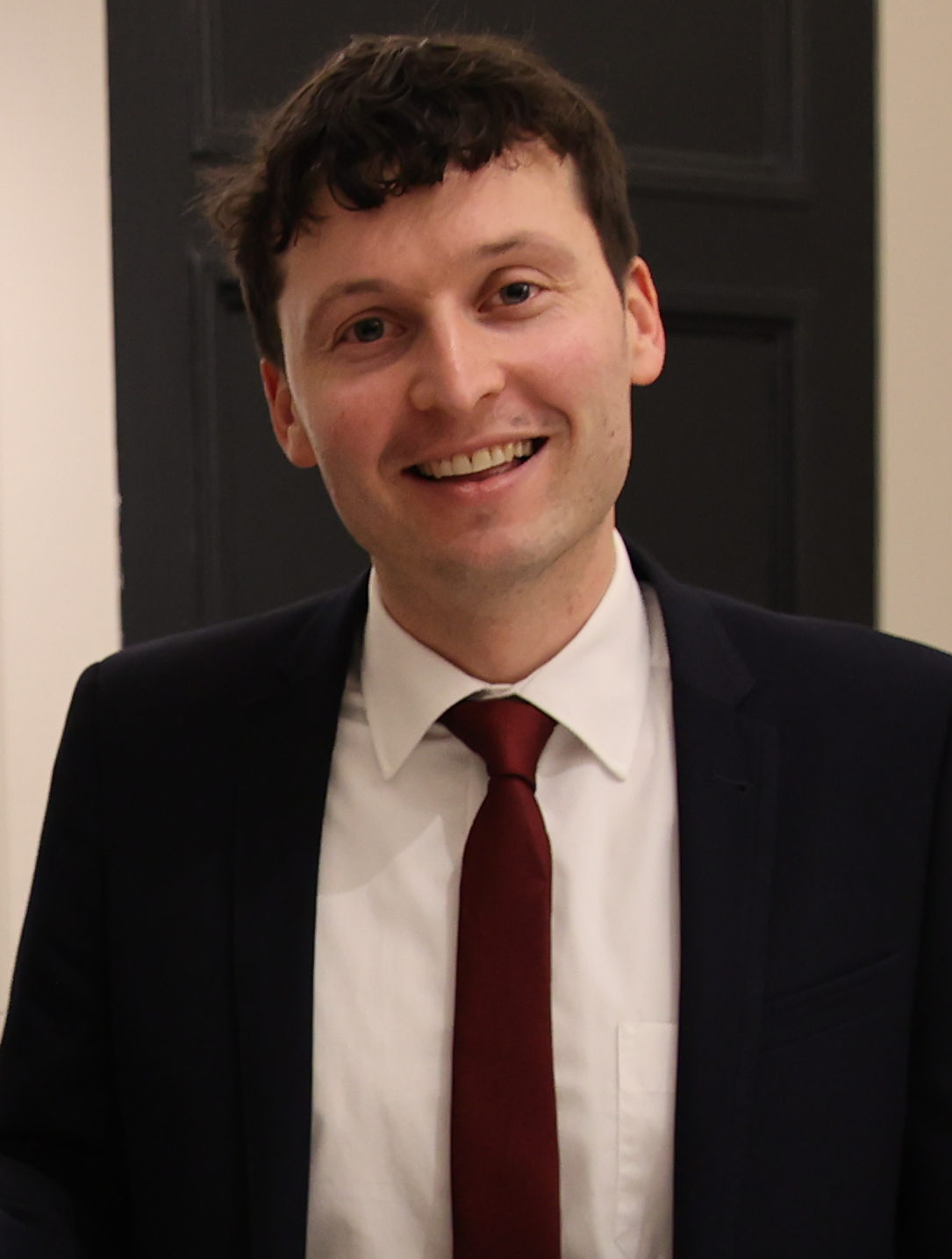
Paul Lawless TD

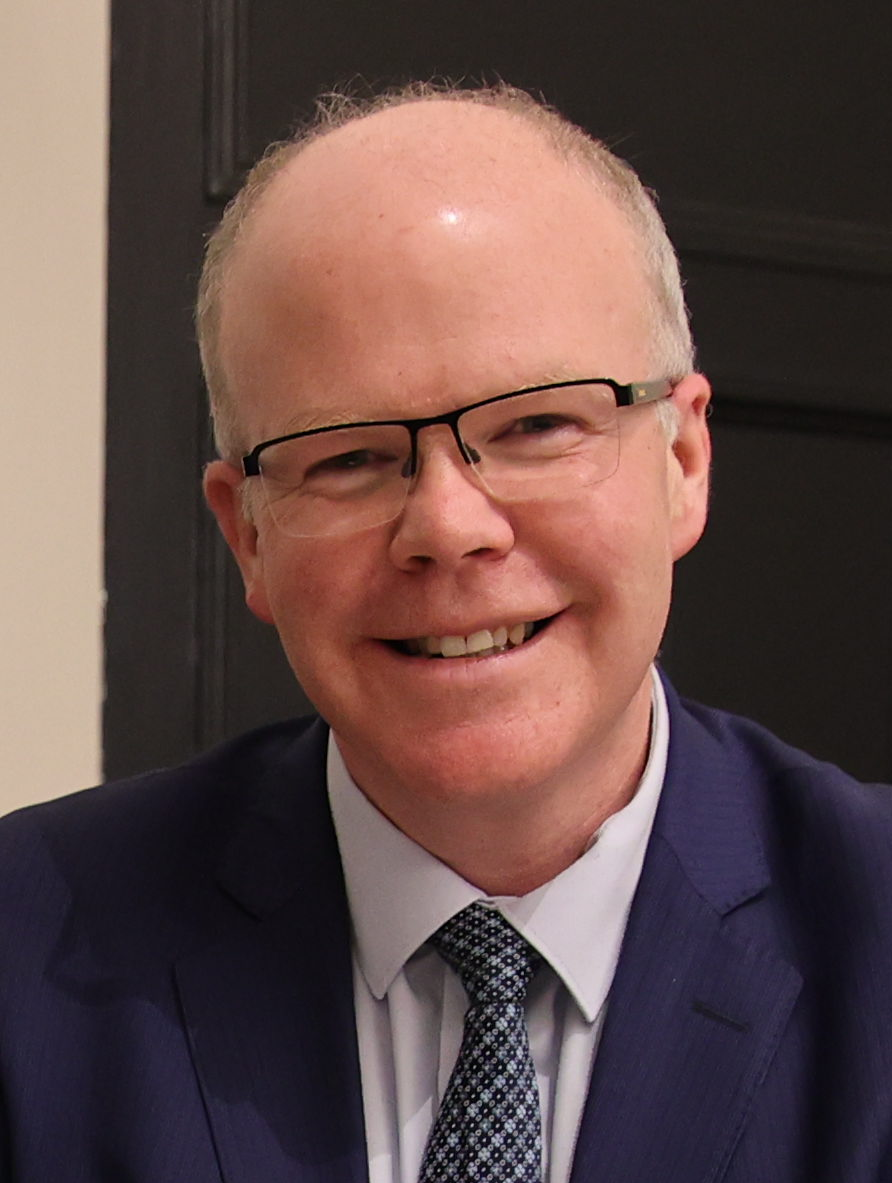
Peadar Tóibín TD

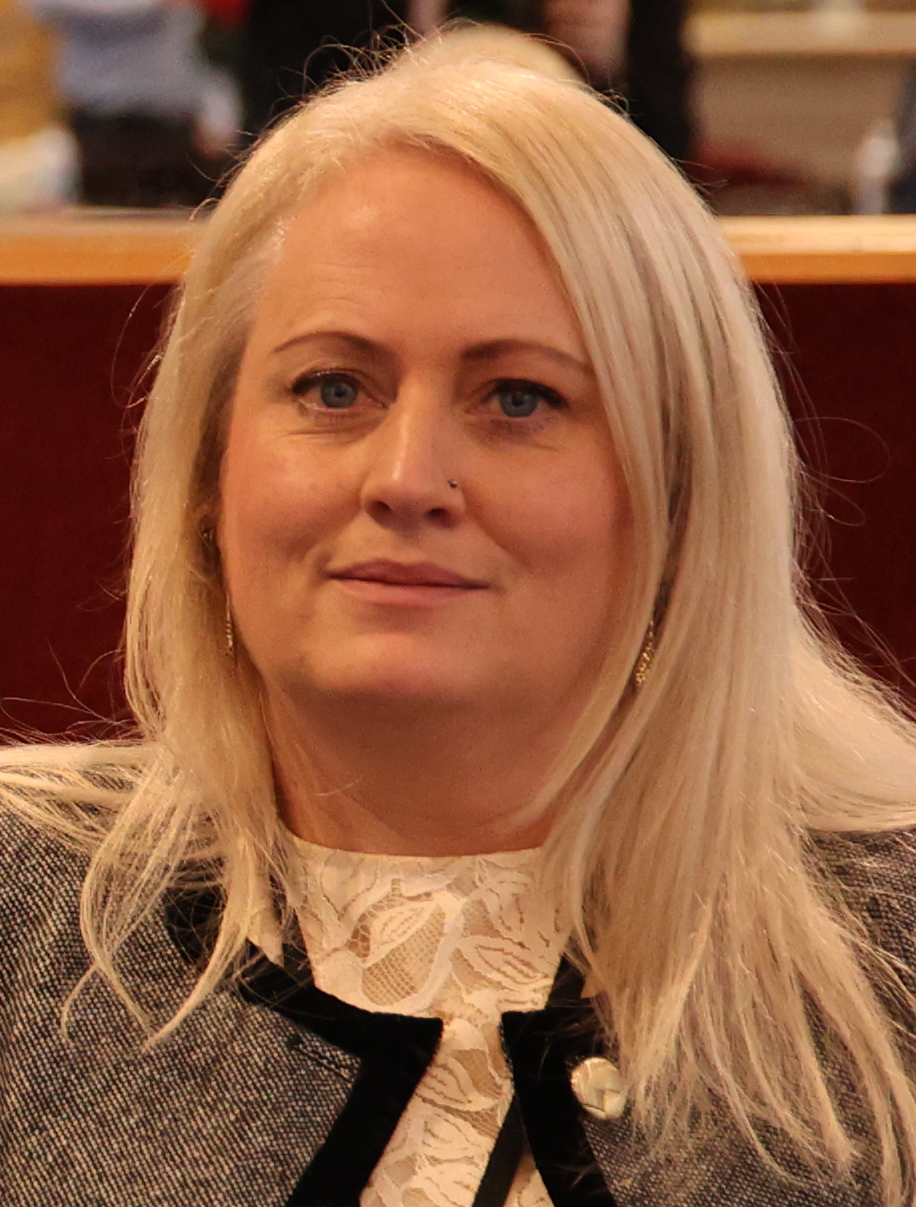
Senator Sarah O'Reilly

Aontu's parliamentary party as of 2025

In 2024, the party campaigned for No votes in the 2024 Irish constitutional referendums; Both referendums were overwhelmingly defeated. Aontú later ran 66 candidates in the 2024 Irish local elections, securing eight council seats. It also fielded candidates in three constituencies for the 2024 European Parliament elections: Peadar Tóibín in Midlands North West, Patrick Murphy in Ireland South and Aisling Considine in Dublin. None were elected. Sarah Beasley also ran, unsuccessfully, as the Aontú candidate in the 2024 Limerick mayoral election. In the 2024 Westminster election in Northern Ireland, Aontú stood in 10 of 18 constituencies, winning no seats from 7,466 votes (1.0% of the total). Aontú won a second seat in the Dáil in the 2024 general election with Paul Lawless elected as a TD for Mayo.

On 8 December, both Aontú TDs joined a technical group 'Regional Group' formed by eight independent TDs - Seán Canney, Marian Harkin, Barry Heneghan, Noel Grealish, Michael Lowry, Kevin "Boxer" Moran, Verona Murphy and Gillian Toole; after Aontú's entrance, the group had 10 TDs in total. The group intended to address regional infrastructure issues such as railway lines, as well as accelerating housing construction.

In January 2025, Aontú left the Regional Group and instead joined a technical group in the Dáil with the political party Independent Ireland.

In October 2025, Aontú expelled six members of its youth wing Ógra Aontú, including its leader John Bryan, for their participation in private WhatsApp groups where they posted messages that contained racist and antisemitic material, including conspiracy theories blaming “Jews” for orchestrating “mass immigration”; Aontú leader Peadar Tóibín said that he was “shocked and disgusted” by the messages.

== Ideology and positions ==
Party founder and leader Peadar Tóibín has described Aontú as left of centre economically while "socially conservative". In 2019, the party was described by the unionist Belfast News Letter as "Catholic conservative", and by The Times as "socially conservative", while Harry McGee described its ideology as "rural conservatism and traditionalism". In 2020, David Quinn of The Sunday Times called Aontú "a pro-life centre-left party". In 2024, Politico and The Connaught Telegraph described Aontú as "right wing", and The Irish Times said it had "positions that lean both left and right". The European Center for Populism Studies described it as populist and "on the right", while Eoin O'Malley, a political science professor at Dublin City University, concurs that Aontú is populist and socially right wing, although he views their economics as left-wing.

The Irish Independent described the party as "economically left-wing, but socially conservative", while political scientist Corinne Deloy wrote that Aontú is "economically positioned on the left of the political spectrum but on the right when it comes to social issues". Political researchers Gilles Ivaldi and Emilia Zankina wrote that the party is left-wing populist, and rivals with Sinn Féin. The party draws support from right-wing voters. During the 2024 general election, its political opponents labelled it far-right, although political scientists Jonathan Arlow and Eoin O’Malley argue that such classification is inappropriate:

Some other parties that contested the 2024 election were labelled ‘far-right’ by political opponents, but the label does not always seem appropriate. […] Aontú clearly holds conservative views on abortion and gender issues, and opposed the family and care referendum proposals in March 2024. Aontú identifies itself on the economic left, though most of its voters place themselves on the right. It was often accused of ‘pandering to the far-right’ or using ‘dog-whistles’ when discussing immigration policies. It advocates for policies that ‘ensure that non-citizens will no longer be prioritised over Irish citizens for any public service’. This is not nativist, insofar that the party does not advocate for the prioritisation of Irish citizens. Its views on limiting migration are hardly extreme, as according to polling they are shared by most Irish people.

=== Social policies and civil rights ===
The party condemns "culture wars" and argues that they serve to distract from the issues of Irish unity and economic justice. In 2023, Peadar Tóibín expressed opposition to sexually explicit material being taught to children in schools. Aontú opposed a 2024 proposed expansion of hate speech laws on the grounds that it amounted to censorship. The party has supported a proposed enquiry into the Irish government's handling of the COVID-19 pandemic. In 2024, Tóibín opposed the possible extension of free contraception to girls aged 16 and described it as the State "giving licence to underage sexual activity" and said Minister for Health Stephen Donnelly was "virtue signalling".

At the party's 2025 Ard Fheis, members voted in favour of "an audit of all DEI policies", the ending of "unconscious bias training" in the Defence Forces, and for an end to media "misinformation" based on off-the-record political briefings. Members also voted in favour of asking the Government to put any future laws on "freedom of speech" to a referendum.

The Irish Catholic editor Michael Kelly believed the party could "capitalise" on the "abandon[ment] [of] many of the values that were key to a largely Catholic electorate in the North" by "the traditional parties of nationalism".

==== Abortion ====
Aontú is anti-abortion, a stance which Tóibín has described as a "core value" of the party.

==== Transgender rights ====
In 2023, Tóibín introduced a bill in the Dáil Éireann to prevent transgender female prisoners from being placed into women's prisons, and in their 2024 manifesto the party called for the repeal of the Gender Recognition Act for the same reason. In 2024, Meath County Councillor Emer Tóibín proposed a motion calling on the LGFA to reverse its transgender policy which allows transgender women and girls to play ladies' Gaelic football. At the party's 2026 Ard Fheis, Tóibin said that his was the only party in the Dáil which opposes what he described as "gender ideology".

==== Religion ====
At its 2025 Ard Fheis, members voted for a ban on "the introduction of Sharia law" or "community courts of any religion".

=== Immigration and asylum policy ===
The party advocates for an immigration policy that is "stricter" and "sustainable", while also containing "compassion and common sense". Tóibín stated that Ireland has a moral obligation to offer sanctuary to immigrants who flee war, famine or violence, but also argued that there should be no "orthodoxy and uniformity" on the issue. In 2021, deputy leader Denise Mullen called for Ireland to offer help during the Afghan refugee crisis. Tóibín supports an "Irish Sea border in terms of people", where asylum seekers who arrive in Northern Ireland would be subject to the same passport controls as at Irish airports and ports. Aontú has called for a greater level of public consultation on immigration.

The party opposed the 2024 EU Asylum and Migration Pact, arguing that it would "erode the ability of domestic governments to manage their immigration systems and adapt to any changes in migration". Aontú also calls for stronger border protection and security, stating that border agencies are understaffed.

The Phoenix has described Tóibín and Aontú as possessing a "strong rightward stance" on immigration while Gerald Howlin of the Irish Examiner has described Tóibín's views on immigration as "nativist". Gilles Ivaldi and Emilia Zankina argue that the party's views on immigration make it a more conservative left-wing populist competitor with Sinn Féin. According to Alaeddine Boutamine of University of Limerick, Aontú "championed programmes in which immigration is characterised as a danger on national identity and resources".

At its 2025 Ard Fheis, Aontú members backed a motion calling for an "outright ban" on anyone who "purposely destroyed their travel documents" entering the State. In the 2024 election, the party called for restricting immigration, and postulated policies that would "ensure that non-citizens will no longer be prioritised over Irish citizens for any public service".

=== European policy ===
Aontú is broadly Eurosceptic, opposing European federalism and a European army. It also speaks against EU enlargement and criticizes the EU for being too centralized; Aontú wishes to "devolve foreign policy back to the nations states".

=== Foreign policy and defence ===
The party supports Irish neutrality and opposes proposals by the Government to remove the requirement of a UN mandate before more than 12 members of the Defence Forces can be deployed abroad. The party opposes a European Defence Union or any moves towards a military alliance. Aontú has also spoken against sending aid to Ukraine.

==== Israel and Palestine ====
The party supports a two-state solution in the Israeli-Palestine conflict. The party takes a pro-Palestine stance, pledging to ban trade with the settlements of Israel, impose economic and military sanctions on Israel, and expelling the Israeli ambassador from Ireland. It also proposes conducting an ethics audit to ensure that Irish public institutions do not cooperate nor fund Israel.

=== Economics ===
The party holds left-wing views on economics and climate change. According to Eoin O'Malley, the party shares the economic positions of Sinn Féin, and places focus on economic justice. Aontú also strongly supports economic welfare. As of early 2020, the party's published policies included proposals for a united Ireland, a referendum on a "right to collective bargaining and trade union membership", an end to zero hours contracts, and increased state spending on public housing. Aontú also proposes reforming the Irish healthcare system into a state-paid one, where the state will cover the operations, treatments and consultations received by Irish patients. Their site states Ireland should model itself on the "best practice in Scandinavian countries". Tóibín stressed the importance of economic issues, stating that one "cannot be a left-wing political party and allow for your communities to slide into poverty and sit by idly by".

In their 2021 budget submission, the party called on changes to the state pension scheme, reducing Leap Card fares and increasing the Banking Levy. Aontú supports the building of a "new international city" in a different part of the country from Dublin. The party also adheres to protectionism and opposes trade deals such as the EU–Mercosur Association Agreement. It also offers to address housing shortage by taking the power to build social homes to public service, limiting the power of corporations in the housing industry and cracking down on "vulture funds". Aontú also proposes linking pensions to the rate of inflation, and extending tax credit increases for workers to pensioners as well. It advocates a reformed social insurance model that would ensure a right to decent income during retirement and prevent workers from losing pension rights because of changing market conditions. The party also proposes reinstating the occupational supplementary pension for workers such as the Defence Forces members.

=== Irish republicanism ===
While Aontú was founded in a split from Sinn Féin, Aontú members and elected representatives come from different political backgrounds: two councillors were former members of the Social Democratic and Labour Party, one councillor was a former member of Fianna Fáil, and two other councillors never held political office prior to joining Aontú. The party retains the ideology of Irish republicanism, and related policies; for example, Aontú maintains a policy of abstentionism, which means that while it runs candidates in Northern Ireland in British general elections, should an Aontú candidate be elected, they would not take up their seat in the British parliament. Political scientist Jack Armstrong described Aontú as radical nationalist.

== Ógra Aontú ==
Aontú's youth branch, Ógra Aontú, was formed in May 2020. Membership of the branch is open to Aontú members aged between 16 and 30. As of April 2024, John Bryan was leading the party's youth wing, but in October 2025 Bryan and several other Ógra members were expelled from the party over racist and antisemitic remarks posted to a WhatsApp group.

== Representatives ==
The party has three representatives at the national level: TDs Peadar Tóibín and Paul Lawless (in Dáil Éireann) and Sarah O'Reilly (in Seanad Éireann).

As of September 2026, Aontú has eleven sitting representatives at local level, ten of whom are county councillors in the Republic of Ireland and one councillor in Northern Ireland.

== Leadership ==
=== Party leader ===
The following are the terms of office as party leader.

Name	Portrait	Period	Constituency
Peadar Tóibín		2019 – present	Meath West

=== Deputy leader ===
Name	Period
Anne McCloskey	July 2019 to October 2020
Denise Mullen	October 2020 to October 2022
Gemma Brolly	October 2022 to present

== Election results ==
=== Dáil Éireann ===
Election	Leader	FPv	%	Seats	%	±	Dáil	Government
2020	Peadar Tóibín	41,575	1.9 (#8)	1 / 160	0.6 (#8)	New	33rd	Opposition; 32nd, 33rd, 34th government (FF-FG-GP majority)
2024	Peadar Tóibín	86,134	3.9 (#6)	2 / 174	1.2 (#8)	▲1	34th	Opposition; 35th government (FF-FG-Ind majority)

=== Seanad Éireann ===
Election	Leader in Seanad	Seats	±	Government
2020	—N/a	0 / 60	Steady	No seats
2025	Sarah O'Reilly	1 / 60	▲1	Opposition

=== Northern Ireland Assembly ===
Election	Leader	1st pref votes	%	Seats	±	Government
2022	Peadar Tóibín	12,777	1.5 (#8)	0 / 90		No seats

=== Westminster elections ===
Election	Leader	Votes	%		Seats (in NI)	±
Election	Leader	Votes	NI	UK	Seats (in NI)	±
2019	Peadar Tóibín	9,814	1.2 (#6)	<0.1	0 / 18	
2024	Peadar Tóibín	7,466	1.0 (#9)	<0.1	0 / 18	Steady

=== Local elections ===
Election	Country	Seats contested	1st pref votes	%	Seats
2019	Northern Ireland	16	7,459	1.1	1 / 462
2019	Republic of Ireland	51	25,660	1.5	3 / 949
2023	Northern Ireland	19	6,771	0.9	0 / 462
2024	Republic of Ireland	66	39,461	2.1	8 / 949

=== European Parliament ===
Election	Leader	1st pref Votes	%	Seats	+/−	EP Group
2024	Peadar Tóibín	65,559	3.76 (#8)	0 / 14	New	−
