= 1985 Monaghan County Council election =

Part of the 1985 Irish local elections

| ← 1979 | 20 June 1985 | 1991 → |

All 20 seats on Monaghan County Council
| | First party | Second party | Third party |
|---|---|---|---|
| Party | Fianna Fáil | Fine Gael | Sinn Féin |
| Seats won | 10 | 7 | 2 |
| Seat change | +1 | -1 | +2 |
| | Fourth party |
| Party | Independent |
| Seats won | 1 |
| Seat change | -2 |
- Map showing the area of Monaghan County Council
Council control after election
TBD

An election to Monaghan County Council took place on 20 June 1985 as part of the Irish local elections. 20 councillors were elected from four local electoral areas (LEAs) for a five-year term of office on the electoral system of proportional representation by means of the single transferable vote (PR-STV). This term was extended for a further year, to 1991.

== Results by party ==
| Party | Seats | ± | First Pref. votes | FPv% | ±% |
|---|---|---|---|---|---|
| Fianna Fáil | 10 | +1 | 11,607 | 44.24% | |
| Fine Gael | 7 | -1 | 8,791 | 33.51% | |
| Sinn Féin | 2 | +2 | 3,168 | 12.07% | |
| Independent | 1 | -2 | 2,455 | 9.36% | |
| Totals | 20 | - | 26,237 | 100.00% | — |

== Results by local electoral area ==
=== Carrickmacross ===
Carrickmacross: 5 seats
| Party | Candidate | FPv% | Count | | | | | | | | |
| Party | Candidate | FPv% | 1 | 2 | 3 | 4 | 5 | 6 | 7 | 8 | 9 |
|---|---|---|---|---|---|---|---|---|---|---|---|
| Fianna Fáil | Dr Rory O'Hanlon TD* | | 1,565 | | | | | | | | |
| Fine Gael | Bill Cotter | | 944 | 968 | 1,013 | 1,024 | 1,040 | 1,112 | 1,322 | | |
| Fine Gael | Patrick Jones* | | 828 | 843 | 857 | 863 | 936 | 1,050 | 1,383 | | |
| Fine Gael | Patrick Ruxton | | 634 | 654 | 657 | 662 | 672 | 734 | | | |
| Fianna Fáil | Pádraig McNally* | | 629 | 738 | 760 | 835 | 992 | 1,040 | 1,103 | 1,171 | |
| Sinn Féin | Rose McMahon | | 562 | 573 | 617 | 649 | 691 | 817 | 852 | 888 | 912 |
| Independent | Peter Murphy | | 558 | 575 | 587 | 650 | 663 | | | | |
| Fianna Fáil | Rosaleen O'Hanlon | | 398 | 532 | 567 | 625 | 768 | 894 | 952 | 985 | 1,025 |
| Fianna Fáil | Tom Freeman | | 388 | 431 | 436 | 470 | | | | | |
| Fianna Fáil | Patrick McKenna | | 274 | 293 | 297 | | | | | | |
| Workers' Party | Francis O'Donoghue | | 193 | 203 | | | | | | | |
Electorate: 9,068 Valid: 6,973 (77.69%) Spoilt: 72 Quota: 1,163 Turnout: 7,045

=== Castleblayney ===
Castleblayney- 5 seats
| Party | Candidate | FPv% | Count | | | | |
| Party | Candidate | FPv% | 1 | 2 | 3 | 4 | 5 |
|---|---|---|---|---|---|---|---|
| Fianna Fáil | Francis O'Brien* | | 1,397 | | | | |
| Fine Gael | Arthur Carville* | | 1,200 | | | | |
| Fine Gael | John F. Conlan TD* | | 1,049 | 1,128 | | | |
| Fianna Fáil | Macartan McCormack* | | 947 | 1,101 | | | |
| Fianna Fáil | Brendan Hughes* | | 811 | 895 | 942 | 998 | 1,017 |
| Fine Gael | Adam Armstrong | | 782 | 792 | 891 | 912 | 929 |
| Independent | Edmund O'Donnell | | 99 | 117 | 120 | | |
| Green Alliance | Eugene Meegan | | 14 | 16 | 17 | | |
Electorate: 8,696 Valid: 6,299 (73.2%) Spoilt: 66 Quota: 1,050 Turnout: 6,365

=== Clones ===
Clones: 4 seats
| Party | Candidate | FPv% | Count | | | |
| Party | Candidate | FPv% | 1 | 2 | 3 | 4 |
|---|---|---|---|---|---|---|
| Fianna Fáil | Jimmy Leonard TD* | | 1,771 | | | |
| Sinn Féin | Pat Treanor | | 906 | 979 | 1,029 | 1,071 |
| Fine Gael | Hugh McElvaney* | | 868 | 934 | 1,290 | |
| Independent | William Doogan* | | 754 | 772 | 825 | 918 |
| Fine Gael | Peter Toal | | 470 | 520 | | |
| Fianna Fáil | Patrick McKenna* | | 359 | 871 | 951 | 1,013 |
| Independent | Joseph Duffy | | 59 | 61 | | |
Electorate: 7,465 Valid: 5,197 (71.01%) Spoilt: 104 Quota: 1,040 Turnout: 5,301

=== Monaghan ===
Monaghan: 6 seats
| Party | Candidate | FPv% | Count | | | | | |
| Party | Candidate | FPv% | 1 | 2 | 3 | 4 | 5 | 6 |
|---|---|---|---|---|---|---|---|---|
| Sinn Féin | Caoimhghin O Caolain | | 1,700 | | | | | |
| Fianna Fáil | Patsy Treanor* | | 1,363 | | | | | |
| Fianna Fáil | Willie McKenna* | | 1,191 | | | | | |
| Independent | James Wright* | | 985 | 1,033 | 1,051 | 1,067 | 1,078 | 1,084 |
| Fine Gael | Thomas Reilly* | | 886 | 981 | 1,163 | | | |
| Fine Gael | Stephen McAree* | | 786 | 887 | 989 | 1,034 | 1,050 | 1,095 |
| Fianna Fáil | Matt Caulfield | | 514 | 807 | 824 | 1,016 | 1,070 | 1,072 |
| Fine Gael | Patrick Macklin | | 344 | 397 | | | | |
Electorate: 11,124 Valid: 7,768 (70.95%) Spoilt: 125 Quota: 1,110 Turnout: 7,893
