= 1991 Monaghan County Council election =

Part of the 1991 Irish local elections

← 1985	27 June 1991	1999 →

All 20 seats on Monaghan County Council
	First party	Second party	Third party
Party	Fianna Fáil	Fine Gael	Sinn Féin
Seats won	8	7	2
Seat change	-2	0	0
	Fourth party
Party	Independent
Seats won	3
Seat change	+2
- Map showing the area of Monaghan County Council
Council control after election
TBD

An election to Monaghan County Council took place on 27 June 1991 as part of that year's Irish local elections. 20 councillors were elected from four local electoral areas (LEAs) for a five-year term of office on the electoral system of proportional representation by means of the single transferable vote (PR-STV). This term was extended twice, first to 1998, then to 1999.

== Results by party ==
Party	Seats	±	First Pref. votes	FPv%	±%
Fianna Fáil	8	-2	9,777	40.12%	
Fine Gael	7	0	7,981	32.75%	
Sinn Féin	2	0	3,396	13.94%	
Independent	3	+2	2,964	12.16%	
Totals	20	0	24,367	100.00%	—

== Results by local electoral area ==
=== Carrickmacross ===
Carrickmacross - 5 seats
Party	Candidate	FPv%	Count							
Party	Candidate	FPv%	1	2	3	4	5	6	7	8
Fine Gael	Bill Cotter TD*	22.4%	1,435							
Fianna Fáil	Pádraig McNally*	18.7%	1,198							
Fianna Fáil	Rosaleen O'Hanlon*	14.3%	917	965	1,024	1,087				
Fine Gael	Patrick Jones*	12.6%	808	1,031	1,041	1,092				
Independent	Peter Murphy	9.6%	615	647	653	691	698	704	802	926
Fianna Fáil	Tom Freeman	8%	515	532	556	584	591	596	659	873
Fianna Fáil	Joe Meegan	5.7%	367	382	403	435	440	445	509	
Sinn Féin	Brian Meegan	4.7%	303	312	316	348	353	356		
Workers' Party	Francis O'Donoghue	3.9%	249	272	272					
Electorate: 9,384 Valid: 6,407 (68.28%) Spoilt: 53 Quota: 1,068 Turnout: 6,460 (68.84%)

=== Castleblayney ===
Castleblayney- 5 seats
Party	Candidate	FPv%	Count						
Party	Candidate	FPv%	1	2	3	4	5	6	7
Fianna Fáil	Senator Francis O'Brien*	19.1%	1,105						
Fine Gael	Arthur Carville*	18.6%	1,080						
Fianna Fáil	Brendan Hughes*	15.2%	879	911	929	944	1,044		
Fine Gael	John F. Conlan*	13.4%	777	805	841	939	1,002		
Fine Gael	Adam Armstrong	12.2%	710	716	757	781	811	828	847
Fianna Fáil	Olivia Keenan	10.3%	598	650	661	714	797	836	852
Sinn Féin	Malachy Woods	6.4%	370	378	383	456			
Independent	Talbot Duffy	4.8%	280	292	294				
Electorate: 8,853 Valid: 5,799 (65.5%) Spoilt: 59 Quota: 967 Turnout: 5,858 (65.87%)

=== Clones ===
Clones - 4 seats
Party	Candidate	FPv%	Count		
Party	Candidate	FPv%	1	2	3
Fianna Fáil	Jimmy Leonard TD*	25.9%	1,314		
Fine Gael	Hugh McElvaney*	18.8%	952	986	1,035
Independent	Walter Pringle	18%	913	938	1,037
Fine Gael	Seymour Crawford	17.9%	910	936	973
Sinn Féin	Pat Treanor*	14.4%	732	755	832
Fianna Fáil	Patrick McKenna*	4.7%	239	429	
Independent	Joseph Duffy	0.2%	12	13	
Electorate: 7,736 Valid: 5,072 (65.56%) Spoilt: 52 Quota: 1,015 Turnout: 5,124 (66.24%)

=== Monaghan ===
Monaghan - 6 seats
Party	Candidate	FPv%	Count				
Party	Candidate	FPv%	1	2	3	4	5
Sinn Féin	Caoimhghin O Caolain*	16.8%	1,193				
Fianna Fáil	Patsy Treanor*	15.9%	1,127				
Fianna Fáil	Willie McKenna*	14.4%	1,019				
Fine Gael	Stephen McAree*	12.7%	899	905	921	978	1,269
Independent	Noel Maxwell	12.4%	877	882	887	925	969
Sinn Féin	Brian McKenna	11.3%	798	942	953	1,003	1,017
Fianna Fáil	Matt Caulfield	7%	499	507	574	617	644
Fine Gael	Timothy O'Hanrahan	5.8%	410	417	425	443	
Independent	Plunkett McKenna	3.8%	267	277	284		
Electorate: 11,830 Valid: 7,089 (59.92%) Spoilt: 77 Quota: 1,013 Turnout: 7,166 (60.57%)
