= Anne Leonard =

Anne Leonard may refer to:

- Ann Leonard (born 1969), Irish politician
- Anne Lennard, Countess of Sussex (1661 - 1721/2), formerly Lady Anne Palmer, alias Fitzroy
