= Seán Conlan =

Irish former politician (born 1975)

Teachta Dála
- In office February 2011 – February 2016
- Constituency: Cavan–Monaghan

Personal details
- Born: 1975 (age 50–51) County Monaghan, Ireland
- Party: Independent (since 2015)
- Other political affiliations: Fine Gael (2009–2015)
- Parent: John Conlan (father)
- Education: University College Dublin

Seán Conlan (born 1975) is an Irish former independent politician, who formerly sat as a member of Fine Gael in Dáil Éireann. He was elected as a TD for the Cavan–Monaghan constituency at the 2011 general election.

He lives in Ballybay, County Monaghan. A solicitor by profession, he was educated at St Macartan's College, Monaghan and at University College Dublin where he obtained an honours degree in economics. He is a son of John Conlan who was TD for Monaghan and Cavan–Monaghan, and also a Senator.

Conlan was elected to Ballybay Town Council at the 2009 local elections, topping the poll on his first attempt. In January 2011 he was added (with only four weeks left) to the Fine Gael ticket for the February general election.

Conlan was the subject of controversy when it was revealed by the Irish Independent that he had hired his girlfriend (a practicing barrister) for the position of his Dáil assistant in 2012. The position comes with an annual salary of €50,000.

In early September 2015 he was arrested under Section 4 of the Criminal Justice Act following a pub brawl on 23 August 2015.

He resigned from Fine Gael on 24 November 2015 and contested the 2016 general election as an independent candidate.

Following his September 2015 arrest, he faced two charges under the Firearms and Offensive Weapons Act and another of assault causing harm. On 1 December 2015 he was remanded on bail, and due to appear before the Carrickmacross District Court in January 2016.

He lost his seat at the 2016 general election.

== See also ==
- Families in the Oireachtas

Dáil	Election	Deputy (Party)	Deputy (Party)	Deputy (Party)	Deputy (Party)	Deputy (Party)
21st	1977	Jimmy Leonard (FF)	John Wilson (FF)	Thomas J. Fitzpatrick (FG)	Rory O'Hanlon (FF)	John Conlan (FG)
22nd	1981	Kieran Doherty (AHB)	John Wilson (FF)	Thomas J. Fitzpatrick (FG)	Rory O'Hanlon (FF)	John Conlan (FG)
23rd	1982 (Feb)	Jimmy Leonard (FF)	John Wilson (FF)	Thomas J. Fitzpatrick (FG)	Rory O'Hanlon (FF)	John Conlan (FG)
24th	1982 (Nov)	Jimmy Leonard (FF)	John Wilson (FF)	Thomas J. Fitzpatrick (FG)	Rory O'Hanlon (FF)	John Conlan (FG)
25th	1987	Jimmy Leonard (FF)	John Wilson (FF)	Thomas J. Fitzpatrick (FG)	Rory O'Hanlon (FF)	Andrew Boylan (FG)
26th	1989	Jimmy Leonard (FF)	John Wilson (FF)	Bill Cotter (FG)	Rory O'Hanlon (FF)	Andrew Boylan (FG)
27th	1992	Jimmy Leonard (FF)	Brendan Smith (FF)	Seymour Crawford (FG)	Rory O'Hanlon (FF)	Andrew Boylan (FG)
28th	1997	Caoimhghín Ó Caoláin (SF)	Brendan Smith (FF)	Seymour Crawford (FG)	Rory O'Hanlon (FF)	Andrew Boylan (FG)
29th	2002	Caoimhghín Ó Caoláin (SF)	Brendan Smith (FF)	Seymour Crawford (FG)	Rory O'Hanlon (FF)	Paudge Connolly (Ind.)
30th	2007	Caoimhghín Ó Caoláin (SF)	Brendan Smith (FF)	Seymour Crawford (FG)	Rory O'Hanlon (FF)	Margaret Conlon (FF)
31st	2011	Caoimhghín Ó Caoláin (SF)	Brendan Smith (FF)	Heather Humphreys (FG)	Joe O'Reilly (FG)	Seán Conlan (FG)
32nd	2016	Caoimhghín Ó Caoláin (SF)	Brendan Smith (FF)	Heather Humphreys (FG)	Niamh Smyth (FF)	4 seats 2016–2020
33rd	2020	Matt Carthy (SF)	Brendan Smith (FF)	Heather Humphreys (FG)	Niamh Smyth (FF)	Pauline Tully (SF)
34th	2024	Matt Carthy (SF)	Brendan Smith (FF)	David Maxwell (FG)	Niamh Smyth (FF)	Cathy Bennett (SF)
