= Cavan–Monaghan =

Dáil constituency (1977–present)

- Dáil constituency
- Location of Cavan–Monaghan within Ireland
- Interactive map of constituency boundaries since the 2024 general election
- Major settlements: Bailieborough; Carrickmacross; Castleblayney; Clones; Virginia; Belturbet; Cavan; Monaghan

Current constituency
- Created: 1977
- Seats: 5 (1977–2016); 4 (2016–2020); 5 (2020–)
- TDs: Cathy Bennett (SF); Matt Carthy (SF); David Maxwell (FG); Brendan Smith (FF); Niamh Smyth (FF)
- Local government areas: County Cavan; County Monaghan
- Created from: Cavan; Monaghan
- EP constituency: Midlands–North-West

Cavan–Monaghan is a parliamentary constituency represented in Dáil Éireann, the lower house of the Irish parliament or Oireachtas. The constituency elects five deputies (Teachtaí Dála, commonly known as TDs) on the system of proportional representation by means of the single transferable vote (PR-STV).

== History and boundaries ==
It was created under the Electoral (Amendment) Act 1974 from the former constituencies of Cavan and Monaghan and was first used at the 1977 general election.

The constituency includes the entire area of both County Cavan and County Monaghan, taking in Cavan town, Monaghan town, Clones, Cootehill, Belturbet, Bailieborough, Castleblayney and Carrickmacross.

At the 2016 general election, 36 electoral divisions in the west of County Cavan were transferred to the Sligo–Leitrim constituency and Cavan–Monaghan became a 4-seat constituency. This was reversed by the Electoral (Amendment) (Dáil Constituencies) Act 2017, which took effect at the 2020 general election.

The Constituency Review Report 2023 of the Electoral Commission recommended that at the next general election, Cavan–Monaghan remain as a five-seat constituency, consisting of the whole of the counties of Cavan and Monaghan, with the area in the north of County Meath transferred to Meath East.

For the 2024 general election, the Electoral (Amendment) Act 2023 defines the constituency as:

"The county of Cavan and the county of Monaghan."

Changes to the Cavan–Monaghan constituency
Years	TDs	Boundaries
1977–1981	5	County Cavan and; County Monaghan, except the part thereof which is in the constituency of Louth
1981–2016	5	County Cavan and County Monaghan.
2016–2020	4	County Monaghan and; County Cavan, except the part thereof which is in the constituency of Sligo–Leitrim.
2020–2024	5	County Cavan and County Monaghan; and, in County Meath, the electoral divisions of: Drumcondra, in the former rural district of Ardee No. 2; Ardagh, Carrickleck, Kilmainham, Moybolgue, Posseckstown and Trohanny in the former rural district of Kells.
2024–	5	County Cavan and County Monaghan

== Constituency profile ==
Cavan–Monaghan is predominantly rural with 75% of the population living outside the main towns. Manufacturing, construction and agriculture are the largest sectors of the local economy.

It is a border constituency and has historically been strongly Republican; hunger striker Kieran Doherty won a seat in the 1981 general election as an Anti H-Block candidate. In 1997, Caoimhghín Ó Caoláin, became the first TD elected for Sinn Féin in any constituency since 1957. In recent elections, the constituency has seen mainly a three-way fight between Fine Gael, Sinn Féin and Fianna Fáil.

== TDs ==
Teachtaí Dála (TDs) for Cavan–Monaghan 1977–
Key to parties: AHB = Anti H-Block; FF = Fianna Fáil; FG = Fine Gael; Ind = Independent; SF = Sinn Féin
Dáil	Election	Deputy (Party)	Deputy (Party)	Deputy (Party)	Deputy (Party)	Deputy (Party)
21st	1977	Jimmy Leonard (FF)	John Wilson (FF)	Thomas J. Fitzpatrick (Note: Fitzpatrick served as Ceann Comhairle in the 24th Dáil from 1982 to 1987 and was returned automatically at the 1987 general election.) (FG)	Rory O'Hanlon (Note: O'Hanlon served as Ceann Comhairle in the 29th Dáil from 2002 to 2007 and was returned automatically at the 2007 general election.) (FF)	John Conlan (FG)
22nd	1981	Kieran Doherty (AHB)	John Wilson (FF)	Thomas J. Fitzpatrick (FG)	Rory O'Hanlon (FF)	John Conlan (FG)
23rd	1982 (Feb)	Jimmy Leonard (FF)	John Wilson (FF)	Thomas J. Fitzpatrick (FG)	Rory O'Hanlon (FF)	John Conlan (FG)
24th	1982 (Nov)	Jimmy Leonard (FF)	John Wilson (FF)	Thomas J. Fitzpatrick (FG)	Rory O'Hanlon (FF)	John Conlan (FG)
25th	1987	Jimmy Leonard (FF)	John Wilson (FF)	Thomas J. Fitzpatrick (FG)	Rory O'Hanlon (FF)	Andrew Boylan (FG)
26th	1989	Jimmy Leonard (FF)	John Wilson (FF)	Bill Cotter (FG)	Rory O'Hanlon (FF)	Andrew Boylan (FG)
27th	1992	Jimmy Leonard (FF)	Brendan Smith (FF)	Seymour Crawford (FG)	Rory O'Hanlon (FF)	Andrew Boylan (FG)
28th	1997	Caoimhghín Ó Caoláin (SF)	Brendan Smith (FF)	Seymour Crawford (FG)	Rory O'Hanlon (FF)	Andrew Boylan (FG)
29th	2002	Caoimhghín Ó Caoláin (SF)	Brendan Smith (FF)	Seymour Crawford (FG)	Rory O'Hanlon (FF)	Paudge Connolly (Ind.)
30th	2007	Caoimhghín Ó Caoláin (SF)	Brendan Smith (FF)	Seymour Crawford (FG)	Rory O'Hanlon (FF)	Margaret Conlon (FF)
31st	2011	Caoimhghín Ó Caoláin (SF)	Brendan Smith (FF)	Heather Humphreys (FG)	Joe O'Reilly (FG)	Seán Conlan (FG)
32nd	2016	Caoimhghín Ó Caoláin (SF)	Brendan Smith (FF)	Heather Humphreys (FG)	Niamh Smyth (FF)	4 seats 2016–2020
33rd	2020	Matt Carthy (SF)	Brendan Smith (FF)	Heather Humphreys (FG)	Niamh Smyth (FF)	Pauline Tully (SF)
34th	2024	Matt Carthy (SF)	Brendan Smith (FF)	David Maxwell (FG)	Niamh Smyth (FF)	Cathy Bennett (SF)

Note: The columns in this table are used only for presentational purposes, and no significance should be attached to the order of columns. For details of the order in which seats were won at each election, see the detailed results of that election.

== Elections ==
*: Outgoing TD

=== 2024 general election ===
2024 general election: Cavan–Monaghan
Party	Candidate	FPv%	Count													
Party	Candidate	FPv%	1	2	3	4	5	6	7	8	9	10	11	12	13	14
Sinn Féin	Matt Carthy	13.5	9,363	9,385	9,446	9,487	9,551	9,857	10,094	10,257	10,337	10,898	10,981	15,121		
Sinn Féin	Cathy Bennett	10.0	6,904	6,933	6,950	6,987	7,013	7,273	7,373	7,490	7,542	8,110	8,220	10,102	13,383	
Fianna Fáil	Brendan Smith	9.6	6,653	6,655	6,660	6,730	6,760	6,841	7,154	7,512	8,523	9,807	10,062	10,522	10,616	10,886
Sinn Féin	Pauline Tully	9.3	6,455	6,465	6,471	6,504	6,643	6,958	7,384	7,520	7,817	7,862	7,868			
Fianna Fáil	Robbie Gallagher	9.1	6,273	6,286	6,319	6,398	6,408	6,472	6,526	6,767	6,857					
Fine Gael	David Maxwell	8.9	6,199	6,215	6,246	6,333	6,368	6,452	6,525	7,695	10,565	12,353				
Fianna Fáil	Niamh Smyth	8.4	5,789	5,803	5,827	5,905	5,961	6,056	6,472	6,996	8,080	10,039	10,313	10,783	10,856	11,058
Aontú	Sarah O'Reilly	7.4	5,148	5,204	5,307	5,342	5,478	6,153	7,122	7,487	8,068	8,407	8,490	8,998	9,129	10,067
Fine Gael	T.P. O'Reilly	6.3	4,328	4,333	4,341	4,399	4,493	4,540	5,118	6,425						
Fine Gael	Carmel Brady	6.1	4,259	4,266	4,272	4,324	4,353	4,415	4,519							
Independent Ireland	Shane P. O'Reilly	4.4	3,078	3,106	3,143	3,161	3,294	3,717								
Irish Freedom Party	Val Martin	1.8	1,258	1,311	1,448	1,449	1,591									
PBP–Solidarity	Emma Hendrick (Note: Hendrick is a member of People Before Profit.)	1.4	967	979	998	1,158	1,194									
Independent	Lester Gordon	1.3	921	998	1,036	1,046										
Green	Eddie O'Gara	1.1	739	746	750											
Liberty Republic	Shane Mulligan	0.7	507	544												
National Party	Mark Moore	0.3	177													
Independent	Joseph Duffy	0.2	122													
Independent	Feargal Deery	0.1	79													
Independent	Jimmy Mee	0.1	27													
Electorate: 109,152 Valid: 69,246 Spoilt: 658 Quota: 11,542 Turnout: 64.0%

=== 2020 general election ===
2020 general election: Cavan–Monaghan
Party	Candidate	FPv%	Count										
Party	Candidate	FPv%	1	2	3	4	5	6	7	8	9	10	11
Sinn Féin	Matt Carthy	22.6	16,310										
Fine Gael	Heather Humphreys	17.7	12,808										
Sinn Féin	Pauline Tully	14.1	10,166	13,457									
Fianna Fáil	Brendan Smith	10.2	7,354	7,434	7,476	7,482	7,519	7,622	7,667	7,840	8,112	8,946	11,004
Fianna Fáil	Niamh Smyth	8.0	5,745	5,889	5,985	5,996	6,053	6,152	6,225	6,322	6,806	8,176	10,951
Fine Gael	T.P. O'Reilly	7.1	5,124	5,154	5,175	5,179	5,390	5,469	5,499	6,592	7,197	8,050	8,646
Fianna Fáil	Robbie Gallagher	7.0	5,062	5,306	5,467	5,476	5,603	5,650	5,692	5,740	6,253	6,882	
Aontú	Sarah O'Reilly	5.3	3,840	3,963	4,204	4,285	4,314	4,416	4,733	4,821	5,745		
Green	Tate Donnelly	3.5	2,501	2,710	3,025	3,061	3,104	3,453	4,075	4,187			
Fine Gael	Sandra McIntyre	1.8	1,301	1,333	1,357	1,365	1,621	1,698	1,719				
Solidarity–PBP	Emmett Smith (Note: Smith was a member of People Before Profit.)	1.2	830	910	1,261	1,279	1,284	1,458					
Labour	Liam van der Spek	1.4	983	1,017	1,128	1,137	1,149						
Independent	Joseph Duffy	0.2	159	171	235								
Electorate: 110,190 Valid: 72,183 Spoilt: 695 Quota: 12,031 Turnout: 72,878 (66.14%)

=== 2016 general election ===
2016 general election: Cavan–Monaghan
Party	Candidate	FPv%	Count									
Party	Candidate	FPv%	1	2	3	4	5	6	7	8	9	10
Fine Gael	Heather Humphreys	20.8	12,391									
Sinn Féin	Caoimhghín Ó Caoláin	16.9	10,060	10,104	10,119	10,265	10,415	10,651	11,047	11,867	17,182	
Fianna Fáil	Brendan Smith	14.7	8,775	8,802	8,807	8,850	8,952	9,046	9,142	10,926	11,357	12,120
Fine Gael	Joe O'Reilly	11.0	6,566	6,846	6,848	6,887	6,977	7,255	7,715	8,063	8,321	8,790
Fianna Fáil	Niamh Smyth	10.5	6,268	6,296	6,297	6,342	6,455	6,584	6,742	8,216	8,762	9,644
Sinn Féin	Kathryn Reilly	10.2	6,066	6,073	6,078	6,268	6,419	6,599	6,737	6,993		
Fianna Fáil	Mike Durkan	4.9	2,909	2,927	2,931	2,941	2,977	3,062	3,246			
Independent	Mary Smyth	2.6	1,589	1,600	1,609	1,709	1,911	2,062	2,340			
Independent	Seán Conlan	2.8	1,665	1,686	1,688	1,754	1,853	1,980				
Green	Mícheál Callaghan	2.1	1,251	1,262	1,269	1,410	1,523					
Independent	John Wilson	1.7	1,023	1,029	1,036	1,171						
Direct Democracy	Mick McDermott	0.8	475	476	479							
Direct Democracy	Aoife O'Connell	0.5	279	282	292							
Independent	Emmett Smith	0.4	245	246	258							
Independent	Jimmy Mee	0.1	88	90								
Electorate: 90,618 Valid: 59,650 Spoilt: 598 (1.0%) Quota: 11,931 Turnout: 60,248 (66.5%)

=== 2011 general election ===
2011 general election: Cavan–Monaghan
Party	Candidate	FPv%	Count								
Party	Candidate	FPv%	1	2	3	4	5	6	7	8	9
Sinn Féin	Caoimhghín Ó Caoláin	16.7	11,913								
Fianna Fáil	Brendan Smith	13.6	9,702	9,734	9,817	10,092	10,249	10,770	11,237	14,667	
Fine Gael	Joe O'Reilly	11.7	8,333	8,361	8,412	8,599	8,679	10,492	11,201	11,305	11,434
Fine Gael	Heather Humphreys	11.4	8,144	8,201	8,374	8,521	8,886	9,565	10,177	10,525	10,861
Fine Gael	Seán Conlan	11.0	7,864	7,924	8,225	8,319	8,728	9,162	9,895	10,623	11,178
Sinn Féin	Kathryn Reilly	9.2	6,539	6,624	6,858	7,289	7,886	8,324	9,627	9,884	10,340
Fianna Fáil	Margaret Conlon	6.5	4,658	4,703	4,817	4,879	5,052	5,070	5,279		
Labour	Liam Hogan	5.6	4,011	4,144	4,273	4,527	4,793	4,998			
Fine Gael	Peter McVitty	5.4	3,858	3,881	3,912	4,207	4,246				
Independent	Seamus Treanor	2.8	1,974	2,007	2,379	2,658					
Independent	Caroline Forde	2.7	1,912	1,993	2,167						
New Vision	John McGuirk (Note: New Vision was an electoral alliance of independent non-party candidates and did not appear on the ballot.)	2.4	1,708	1,760							
Green	Darcy Lonergan	0.7	530								
Independent	Joseph Duffy	0.2	129								
Electorate: 99,178 Valid: 71,275 Spoilt: 867 (1.2%) Quota: 11,880 Turnout: 72,142 (72.7%)

=== 2007 general election ===
Rory O'Hanlon was Ceann Comhairle at the dissolution of the 29th Dáil and therefore deemed to be returned automatically. The constituency was treated as a four-seater for the purposes of calculating the quota.

2007 general election: Cavan–Monaghan
Party	Candidate	FPv%	Count			
Party	Candidate	FPv%	1	2	3	4
Fianna Fáil	Rory O'Hanlon	N/A	Returned automatically			
Fianna Fáil	Brendan Smith	23.6	15,548			
Sinn Féin	Caoimhghín Ó Caoláin	20.0	13,162			
Fine Gael	Seymour Crawford	16.7	10,978	11,057	11,199	13,758
Fine Gael	Joe O'Reilly	14.5	9,550	9,895	10,214	11,238
Fianna Fáil	Margaret Conlon	14.1	9,303	11,062	11,145	13,203
Independent	Paudge Connolly	6.0	3,955	4,034	4,157	
Green	Vincent P. Martin	3.6	2,382	2,445	2,687	
Labour	Des Cullen	1.2	796	849		
Independent	T. J. Fay	0.2	113	125		
Electorate: 92,248 Valid: 65,787 Spoilt: 760 (1.2%) Quota: 13,158 Turnout: 66,547 (72.2%)

=== 2002 general election ===
2002 general election: Cavan–Monaghan
Party	Candidate	FPv%	Count											
Party	Candidate	FPv%	1	2	3	4	5	6	7	8	9	10	11	12
Sinn Féin	Caoimhghín Ó Caoláin	17.5	10,832											
Fianna Fáil	Brendan Smith	17.3	10,679											
Independent	Paudge Connolly	12.5	7,722	7,867	7,871	7,946	8,375	8,614	8,973	9,678	10,870			
Fianna Fáil	Rory O'Hanlon	11.6	7,204	7,295	7,479	7,541	7,648	7,807	7,943	8,662	11,032			
Fine Gael	Seymour Crawford	9.9	6,113	6,136	6,139	6,178	6,286	6,397	6,509	6,803	7,078	7,392	7,702	9,165
Fine Gael	Andrew Boylan	7.8	4,819	4,855	4,889	5,061	5,084	5,211	5,374	5,516	5,633	5,844	5,905	9,044
Fine Gael	Paddy O'Reilly	7.5	4,639	4,667	4,698	4,817	4,836	4,955	5,108	5,320	5,429	5,628	5,710	
Fianna Fáil	Robbie Gallagher	6.0	3,731	3,789	3,874	3,921	4,004	4,197	4,319	4,535				
Independent	Vincent P. Martin	3.1	1,943	1,992	1,997	2,087	2,265	2,371	2,646					
Progressive Democrats	Gerry McCaughey	1.8	1,131	1,144	1,154	1,219	1,261							
Green	Marcus McCabe	1.8	1,100	1,138	1,143	1,301	1,385	1,513						
Independent	Joe Brennan	1.7	1,026	1,046	1,047	1,114								
Labour	Francie Fitzsimons	0.9	550	566	572									
Christian Solidarity	Tony Smith	0.6	358	365	368									
Electorate: 87,595 Valid: 61,847 Spoilt: 863 (1.4%) Quota: 10,308 Turnout: 62,710 (71.6%)

=== 1997 general election ===
1997 general election: Cavan–Monaghan
Party	Candidate	FPv%	Count						
Party	Candidate	FPv%	1	2	3	4	5	6	7
Sinn Féin	Caoimhghín Ó Caoláin	19.4	11,531						
Fianna Fáil	Brendan Smith	15.1	8,998	9,194	9,196	9,551	9,733	10,434	
Fianna Fáil	Rory O'Hanlon	12.3	7,325	7,692	7,700	8,020	8,394	8,615	9,551
Fianna Fáil	Ann Leonard	11.0	6,564	6,881	6,898	7,259	7,638	7,786	8,181
Fine Gael	Seymour Crawford	11.0	6,552	6,651	6,660	6,796	7,173	7,800	10,288
Fine Gael	Andrew Boylan	8.2	4,894	4,956	4,963	5,140	5,506	8,198	9,706
Fine Gael	Bill Cotter	7.8	4,665	4,774	4,779	4,920	5,396	5,857	
Fine Gael	Paddy O'Reilly	7.6	4,532	4,589	4,593	4,799	5,130		
Labour	Ann Gallagher	4.0	2,359	2,535	2,557	2,735			
Christian Solidarity	Gene Flood	1.7	1,024	1,151	1,181				
Christian Solidarity	Larry McGinn	1.7	1,001	1,062	1,080				
Independent	Joseph Duffy	0.2	99	134					
Electorate: 83,005 Valid: 59,544 Spoilt: 601 (1.0%) Quota: 9,925 Turnout: 60,145 (72.5%)

=== 1992 general election ===
1992 general election: Cavan–Monaghan
Party	Candidate	FPv%	Count							
Party	Candidate	FPv%	1	2	3	4	5	6	7	8
Fianna Fáil	Rory O'Hanlon	13.0	7,125	7,129	7,187	7,278	8,086	8,715	9,045	9,767
Fianna Fáil	Brendan Smith	12.9	7,063	7,069	7,177	7,335	9,162			
Fianna Fáil	Jimmy Leonard	11.9	6,555	6,561	6,596	6,645	7,056	7,838	7,981	8,344
Fine Gael	Bill Cotter	9.7	5,291	5,301	5,321	5,364	5,377	5,622	5,931	
Fine Gael	Seymour Crawford	9.5	5,192	5,194	5,208	5,502	5,553	5,747	6,224	8,653
Fine Gael	Andrew Boylan	8.7	4,763	4,767	4,826	5,105	5,263	5,347	7,768	9,285
Labour	Ann Gallagher	8.3	4,543	4,595	4,640	4,996	5,105	5,978	6,593	7,234
Sinn Féin	Caoimhghín Ó Caoláin	7.7	4,197	4,215	4,244	4,312	4,345			
Fine Gael	Joe O'Reilly	7.2	3,942	3,970	4,001	4,304	4,593	4,692		
Fianna Fáil	Michael Smith	6.5	3,551	3,553	3,665	3,808				
Independent	Winston Turner	3.3	1,825	1,837	1,945					
Independent	Mary Smith	1.3	686	690						
Workers' Party	Jim Finnegan	0.3	157							
Electorate: 79,011 Valid: 54,890 Spoilt: 993 (1.8%) Quota: 9,149 Turnout: 55,883 (70.7%)

=== 1989 general election ===
1989 general election: Cavan–Monaghan
Party	Candidate	FPv%	Count						
Party	Candidate	FPv%	1	2	3	4	5	6	7
Fianna Fáil	John Wilson	18.3	9,708						
Fianna Fáil	Rory O'Hanlon	16.3	8,663	9,103					
Fianna Fáil	Jimmy Leonard	16.0	8,500	8,727	8,954				
Fine Gael	Andrew Boylan	13.5	7,180	7,232	7,232	7,257	7,415	7,600	7,971
Fine Gael	Bill Cotter	12.7	6,765	6,770	6,773	6,798	6,848	7,081	7,665
Fine Gael	Joe O'Reilly	10.5	5,660	5,610	5,615	5,623	5,774	6,008	6,516
Sinn Féin	Caoimhghín Ó Caoláin	9.1	4,849	4,867	4,872	4,885	4,959	5,163	
Independent	Margaret Kiernan	2.0	1,069	1,073	1,075	1,113	1,250		
Independent	Damien Matthews	1.3	705	717	721	745			
Independent	Joseph Duffy	0.3	155	156	156				
Electorate: 75,712 Valid: 53,154 Spoilt: 1,041 (1.9%) Quota: 8,852 Turnout: 54,195 (71.6%)

=== 1987 general election ===
Thomas J. Fitzpatrick was Ceann Comhairle at the dissolution of the 24th Dáil and therefore deemed to be returned automatically. The constituency was treated as a four-seater for the purposes of calculating the quota.

1987 general election: Cavan–Monaghan
Party	Candidate	FPv%	Count				
Party	Candidate	FPv%	1	2	3	4	5
Fine Gael	Thomas J. Fitzpatrick	N/A	Returned automatically				
Fianna Fáil	Rory O'Hanlon	19.5	11,265	11,306	11,394	11,657	
Fianna Fáil	John Wilson	19.3	11,163	11,178	11,250	11,599	
Fine Gael	Andrew Boylan	17.5	10,132	10,175	10,253	10,646	10,929
Fianna Fáil	Jimmy Leonard	16.1	9,319	9,444	9,498	9,790	11,985
Fine Gael	John Conlan	15.2	8,795	8,875	8,933	9,183	9,568
Sinn Féin	Caoimhghín Ó Caoláin	7.3	4,219	4,267	4,352	4,673	
Independent	Patrick McKiernan	3.2	1,868	1,922	2,051		
Workers' Party	Oliver Rogers	1.0	577	603			
Independent	Pádraig Duffy	0.8	474				
Electorate: 75,742 Valid: 57,812 Quota: 11,563 Turnout: 76.3%

=== November 1982 general election ===
November 1982 general election: Cavan–Monaghan
Party	Candidate	FPv%	Count				
Party	Candidate	FPv%	1	2	3	4	5
Fianna Fáil	John Wilson	18.8	10,779				
Fine Gael	Thomas J. Fitzpatrick	16.0	9,185	9,264	9,270	9,927	
Fianna Fáil	Jimmy Leonard	15.0	8,611	8,697	8,712	8,980	10,201
Fianna Fáil	Rory O'Hanlon	14.6	8,372	8,615	8,642	8,736	11,605
Fine Gael	John Conlan	13.2	7,560	7,563	7,573	9,916	
Fine Gael	Aileen Cahill	8.9	5,106	5,140	5,160	5,586	5,795
Fine Gael	Hugh McElvaney	6.7	3,852	3,858	3,865		
Fianna Fáil	Michael Smith	6.4	3,639	4,422	4,459	4,491	
Independent	Seán Ó Neill MacGabhann	0.3	143	146			
Electorate: 74,446 Valid: 57,247 Quota: 9,542 Turnout: 76.9%

=== February 1982 general election ===
February 1982 general election: Cavan–Monaghan
Party	Candidate	FPv%	Count					
Party	Candidate	FPv%	1	2	3	4	5	6
Fianna Fáil	John Wilson	16.8	9,776					
Fianna Fáil	Jimmy Leonard	14.8	8,585	8,614	8,427	8,857	9,890	
Fine Gael	Thomas J. Fitzpatrick	14.3	8,317	8,386	8,427	8,956	9,236	9,753
Fine Gael	John Conlan	12.9	7,486	7,512	7,603	8,545	8,613	9,051
Fine Gael	Robert Fausset	11.7	6,808	6,833	6,867	7,191	7,268	7,378
Fianna Fáil	Rory O'Hanlon	11.4	6,651	6,692	6,798	6,857	8,697	10,159
Independent	Séamus McElwaine	6.8	3,974	4,079	4,183	4,243	4,365	
Fianna Fáil	Michael Smith	5.9	3,399	3,481	3,526	3,584		
Fine Gael	Thomas O'Reilly	3.7	2,152	2,167	2,191			
Sinn Féin The Workers' Party	Francis O'Donoghue	0.9	529	567				
Independent	James Kelly	0.8	455					
Electorate: 73,601 Valid: 58,132 Spoilt: 491 (0.8%) Quota: 9,689 Turnout: 58,623 (79.6%)

=== 1981 general election ===
1981 general election: Cavan–Monaghan
Party	Candidate	FPv%	Count						
Party	Candidate	FPv%	1	2	3	4	5	6	7
Fianna Fáil	John Wilson	15.6	9,424	9,467	9,543	12,122			
Anti H-Block	Kieran Doherty	15.1	9,121	9,197	9,342	9,469	9,580	9,709	10,063
Fine Gael	Thomas J. Fitzpatrick	12.0	7,257	7,946	8,660	8,807	8,908	13,109	
Fianna Fáil	Jimmy Leonard	11.6	6,984	7,039	7,082	7,240	7,752	7,997	8,304
Fine Gael	Robert Fausset	11.2	6,785	6,994	7,572	7,637	7,657		
Fianna Fáil	Rory O'Hanlon	11.0	6,662	6,694	6,861	7,252	8,548	8,738	9,016
Fine Gael	John Conlan	10.6	6,431	6,775	7,777	7,802	7,815	10,355	
Fianna Fáil	Michael Smith	5.7	3,431	3,483	3,535				
Fine Gael	Aidan Murray	4.3	2,565	2,803					
Fine Gael	Mona Hoban	2.9	1,741						
Electorate: 70,995 Valid: 60,411 Spoilt: 584 (0.9%) Quota: 10,069 Turnout: 60,995 (85.9%)

Kieran Doherty died on hunger strike on 2 August 1981. On 21 October 1981, a Fianna Fáil motion to move the writ of election for the vacancy was opposed by the Fine Gael–Labour government and was defeated on a vote of 78 to 80. On 26 January 1982, a second motion in the same terms was defeated on a vote of 78 to 81. The Dáil was dissolved on the following day, 27 January 1982.

=== 1977 general election ===
1977 general election: Cavan–Monaghan
Party	Candidate	FPv%	Count							
Party	Candidate	FPv%	1	2	3	4	5	6	7	8
Fianna Fáil	John Wilson	16.3	9,168	9,214	9,585					
Fine Gael	Thomas J. Fitzpatrick	16.2	9,060	9,104	9,396					
Fianna Fáil	Jimmy Leonard	15.5	8,695	8,806	9,140	9,167	9,189	10,922		
Fine Gael	John Conlan	11.3	6,347	6,408	6,476	6,482	7,752	7,901	7,943	8,030
Fianna Fáil	Rory O'Hanlon	10.8	6,045	6,187	6,482	6,531	6,604	9,305	10,623	
Fine Gael	Brendan Toal	10.4	5,809	5,861	5,932	5,935	7,542	7,729	7,753	7,811
Fianna Fáil	Michael Smith	8.8	4,912	4,936	5,220	5,366	5,569			
Fine Gael	John McKenna	5.6	3,166	3,183	3,332	3,348				
Independent	James Kelly	3.6	2,016	2,246						
Sinn Féin The Workers' Party	Owen Kirk	1.3	713							
Independent	Patrick Harwood	0.2	94							
Electorate: 69,935 Valid: 56,025 Quota: 9,338 Turnout: 80.1%

== See also ==
- Elections in the Republic of Ireland
- Politics of the Republic of Ireland
- List of Dáil by-elections
- List of political parties in the Republic of Ireland
