= Margaret Conlon =

Irish politician (born 1967)

Teachta Dála
- In office May 2007 – February 2011
- Constituency: Cavan–Monaghan

Personal details
- Born: 17 September 1967 (age 59) Cavan, Ireland
- Party: Fianna Fáil
- Spouse: Séamus Conlon
- Children: 3
- Education: NUI Maynooth

Margaret Conlon (born 17 September 1967) is an Irish Fianna Fáil politician who served as a TD for the Cavan–Monaghan constituency from 2007 to 2011.

She was elected at the 2007 general election. She lives in Lough Egish in County Monaghan, with her husband Séamus, two sons and one daughter. She was a founding member of the Fianna Fáil cumann at NUI Maynooth and was a member of the party's National Executive from 1986 to 1988.

She lost her seat at the 2011 general election. Following the loss of her Dáil seat, she ran for a seat in the 24th Seanad, on the Industrial and Commercial Panel. She received 4.4% of the vote share, but was not elected. In 2014, she ran for a seat on Monaghan County Council in the Carrickmacross–Castleblayney area, and received 6.8% of the vote share, but was not elected. In August 2025, Conlon retired as principal of Saint Louis Secondary School Monaghan.

In October 2026, she was co-opted on to Monaghan County Council.

Dáil	Election	Deputy (Party)	Deputy (Party)	Deputy (Party)	Deputy (Party)	Deputy (Party)
21st	1977	Jimmy Leonard (FF)	John Wilson (FF)	Thomas J. Fitzpatrick (FG)	Rory O'Hanlon (FF)	John Conlan (FG)
22nd	1981	Kieran Doherty (AHB)	John Wilson (FF)	Thomas J. Fitzpatrick (FG)	Rory O'Hanlon (FF)	John Conlan (FG)
23rd	1982 (Feb)	Jimmy Leonard (FF)	John Wilson (FF)	Thomas J. Fitzpatrick (FG)	Rory O'Hanlon (FF)	John Conlan (FG)
24th	1982 (Nov)	Jimmy Leonard (FF)	John Wilson (FF)	Thomas J. Fitzpatrick (FG)	Rory O'Hanlon (FF)	John Conlan (FG)
25th	1987	Jimmy Leonard (FF)	John Wilson (FF)	Thomas J. Fitzpatrick (FG)	Rory O'Hanlon (FF)	Andrew Boylan (FG)
26th	1989	Jimmy Leonard (FF)	John Wilson (FF)	Bill Cotter (FG)	Rory O'Hanlon (FF)	Andrew Boylan (FG)
27th	1992	Jimmy Leonard (FF)	Brendan Smith (FF)	Seymour Crawford (FG)	Rory O'Hanlon (FF)	Andrew Boylan (FG)
28th	1997	Caoimhghín Ó Caoláin (SF)	Brendan Smith (FF)	Seymour Crawford (FG)	Rory O'Hanlon (FF)	Andrew Boylan (FG)
29th	2002	Caoimhghín Ó Caoláin (SF)	Brendan Smith (FF)	Seymour Crawford (FG)	Rory O'Hanlon (FF)	Paudge Connolly (Ind.)
30th	2007	Caoimhghín Ó Caoláin (SF)	Brendan Smith (FF)	Seymour Crawford (FG)	Rory O'Hanlon (FF)	Margaret Conlon (FF)
31st	2011	Caoimhghín Ó Caoláin (SF)	Brendan Smith (FF)	Heather Humphreys (FG)	Joe O'Reilly (FG)	Seán Conlan (FG)
32nd	2016	Caoimhghín Ó Caoláin (SF)	Brendan Smith (FF)	Heather Humphreys (FG)	Niamh Smyth (FF)	4 seats 2016–2020
33rd	2020	Matt Carthy (SF)	Brendan Smith (FF)	Heather Humphreys (FG)	Niamh Smyth (FF)	Pauline Tully (SF)
34th	2024	Matt Carthy (SF)	Brendan Smith (FF)	David Maxwell (FG)	Niamh Smyth (FF)	Cathy Bennett (SF)
