= Joe O'Reilly =

Irish politician (born 1955)

Senator Joe O'Reilly
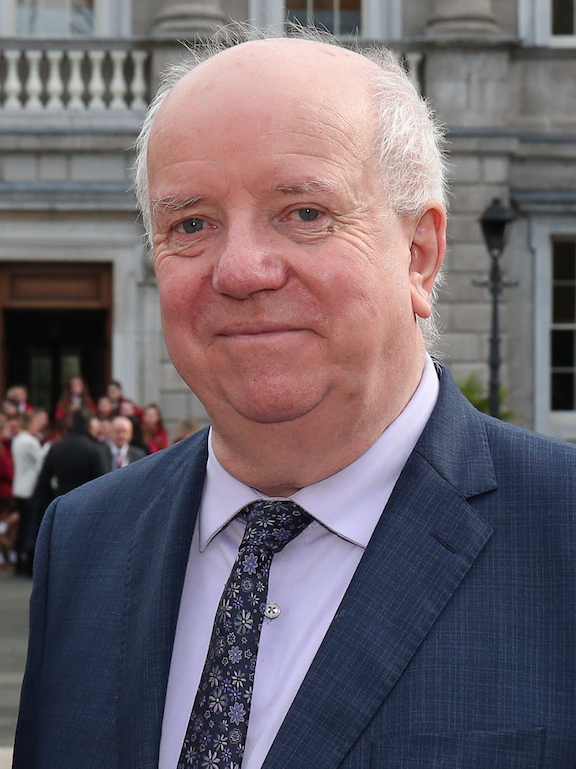

Leas-Chathaoirleach of Seanad Éireann
- In office 22 August 2020 – 16 December 2022
- Cathaoirleach: Mark Daly
- Preceded by: Jerry Buttimer
- Succeeded by: Mark Daly

Senator
- Incumbent
- Assumed office 8 June 2016
- Constituency: Labour Panel
- In office 13 September 2007 – 25 February 2011
- Constituency: Industrial and Commercial Panel
- In office 1 November 1989 – 17 February 1993
- Constituency: Cultural and Educational Panel

Teachta Dála
- In office February 2011 – February 2016
- Constituency: Cavan–Monaghan

Personal details
- Born: Joseph Patrick O'Reilly; 1 April 1955 (age 71) Cootehill, County Cavan, Ireland
- Party: Fine Gael
- Spouse: Mary Tully (m. 1989)
- Children: 3
- Education: University College Dublin; Trinity College Dublin; St Patrick's College, Dublin; Dublin Institute of Technology
- Website: joeoreilly.ie

Joe O'Reilly (born 1 April 1955) is an Irish Fine Gael politician who has served as a senator for the Labour Panel since April 2016, and previously from 2007 to 2011 for the Industrial and Commercial Panel and from 1989 to 1992 for the Cultural and Educational Panel. He served as Leas-Chathaoirleach of Seanad Éireann from August 2020 to December 2022. He served as a TD for the Cavan–Monaghan constituency from 2011 to 2016.

== Early and personal life ==
Born in Cootehill, County Cavan, he was educated at St Patrick's College, Cavan; St. Aidan's Comprehensive School, Cootehill; University College Dublin; Trinity College Dublin; St Patrick's College, Dublin and the Dublin Institute of Technology. O'Reilly is a primary school teacher by profession.

== Political career ==
In local politics, he was first elected to Cavan County Council in 1985 but lost his seat in 1991. He was re-elected at the 1999 local elections for the Bailieborough local electoral area and again in 2004.

He was a candidate at the 2007 general election for Cavan–Monaghan. As Rory O'Hanlon had served as Ceann Comhairle in the 29th Dáil, he was automatically re-elected and therefore the seats were reduced from 5 to 4 in the constituency. He finished with a total of 9,550 first preference votes, the highest losing vote in the country in that election. He won a seat in the general election in February 2011. He lost this Dáil seat at the 2016 general election.

In European elections, he was an unsuccessful candidate at the 2009 European Parliament election, for the North-West constituency.

As a Senator, he was first elected in 1989 to the 19th Seanad, on the Cultural and Educational Panel. He lost his seat at the 1993 Seanad elections and was unsuccessful again at the 1997 Seanad election. He was elected to the 23rd Seanad in 2007, serving on the Industrial and Commercial Panel and as Fine Gael Seanad Spokesperson on Communications, Energy and Natural Resources. O'Reilly was elected to the Labour Panel of the 25th Seanad in April 2016.

He is the Fine Gael Seanad Spokesperson on Foreign Affairs and Trade.

== Political views ==
In 2017, Fine Gael announced that they were planning a bill to allow pubs to open on Good Friday, reversing a 90-year-old ban. O'Reilly went against his party's view and said that the tradition was "part of our national identity".

Dáil	Election	Deputy (Party)	Deputy (Party)	Deputy (Party)	Deputy (Party)	Deputy (Party)
21st	1977	Jimmy Leonard (FF)	John Wilson (FF)	Thomas J. Fitzpatrick (FG)	Rory O'Hanlon (FF)	John Conlan (FG)
22nd	1981	Kieran Doherty (AHB)	John Wilson (FF)	Thomas J. Fitzpatrick (FG)	Rory O'Hanlon (FF)	John Conlan (FG)
23rd	1982 (Feb)	Jimmy Leonard (FF)	John Wilson (FF)	Thomas J. Fitzpatrick (FG)	Rory O'Hanlon (FF)	John Conlan (FG)
24th	1982 (Nov)	Jimmy Leonard (FF)	John Wilson (FF)	Thomas J. Fitzpatrick (FG)	Rory O'Hanlon (FF)	John Conlan (FG)
25th	1987	Jimmy Leonard (FF)	John Wilson (FF)	Thomas J. Fitzpatrick (FG)	Rory O'Hanlon (FF)	Andrew Boylan (FG)
26th	1989	Jimmy Leonard (FF)	John Wilson (FF)	Bill Cotter (FG)	Rory O'Hanlon (FF)	Andrew Boylan (FG)
27th	1992	Jimmy Leonard (FF)	Brendan Smith (FF)	Seymour Crawford (FG)	Rory O'Hanlon (FF)	Andrew Boylan (FG)
28th	1997	Caoimhghín Ó Caoláin (SF)	Brendan Smith (FF)	Seymour Crawford (FG)	Rory O'Hanlon (FF)	Andrew Boylan (FG)
29th	2002	Caoimhghín Ó Caoláin (SF)	Brendan Smith (FF)	Seymour Crawford (FG)	Rory O'Hanlon (FF)	Paudge Connolly (Ind.)
30th	2007	Caoimhghín Ó Caoláin (SF)	Brendan Smith (FF)	Seymour Crawford (FG)	Rory O'Hanlon (FF)	Margaret Conlon (FF)
31st	2011	Caoimhghín Ó Caoláin (SF)	Brendan Smith (FF)	Heather Humphreys (FG)	Joe O'Reilly (FG)	Seán Conlan (FG)
32nd	2016	Caoimhghín Ó Caoláin (SF)	Brendan Smith (FF)	Heather Humphreys (FG)	Niamh Smyth (FF)	4 seats 2016–2020
33rd	2020	Matt Carthy (SF)	Brendan Smith (FF)	Heather Humphreys (FG)	Niamh Smyth (FF)	Pauline Tully (SF)
34th	2024	Matt Carthy (SF)	Brendan Smith (FF)	David Maxwell (FG)	Niamh Smyth (FF)	Cathy Bennett (SF)
