= Kathryn Reilly =

Irish politician (born 1988)

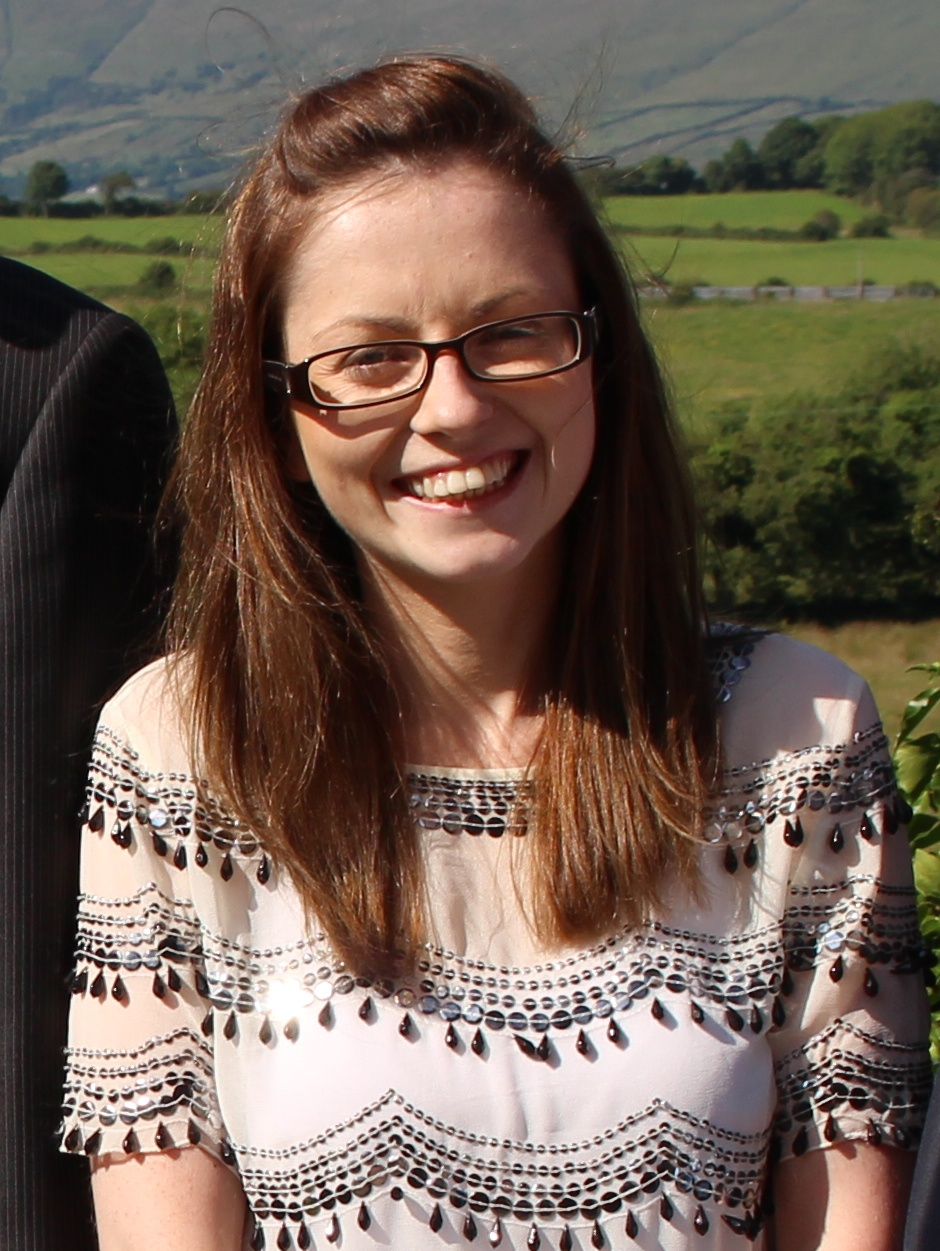
- Reilly in 2013

Senator
- In office 25 May 2011 – 8 June 2016
- Constituency: Industrial and Commercial Panel

Personal details
- Born: 17 September 1988 (age 38) Ballyjamesduff, Cavan, Ireland
- Party: Sinn Féin
- Education: Dublin City University; University College Dublin

Kathryn Reilly (born 17 September 1988) is an Irish Sinn Féin politician and former member of Seanad Éireann.

== Early life and education ==
Reilly grew up in Ballyjamesduff, County Cavan. She has a degree in economics from Dublin City University, and a master's degree in European economic and public affairs from University College Dublin. She previously worked as a parliamentary assistant to former Sinn Féin TD Arthur Morgan.

== Political career ==
Reilly entered politics for election to Dáil Éireann in the Cavan–Monaghan constituency at the 2011 general election, but was not elected. In April 2011 she was elected to Seanad Éireann on the Industrial and Commercial Panel.

She was the youngest member of the Oireachtas in 2011; having been elected at age 22, and she is the youngest ever elected member of the Seanad.

She was again an unsuccessful candidate in Cavan–Monaghan at the 2016 general election.

In March 2016, she confirmed her intention not to run for re-election to the Seanad, saying she felt "cast aside" by the party.
