= Kieran Doherty (hunger striker) =

Irish republican hunger striker and politician (1955–1981)

Teachta Dála
- In office June 1981 – 2 August 1981
- Constituency: Cavan–Monaghan

Personal details
- Born: 16 October 1955 Andersonstown, Belfast, Northern Ireland
- Died: 2 August 1981 (aged 25) HM Prison Maze, County Down, Northern Ireland
- Cause of death: Died after 73 days on hunger strike
- Resting place: Milltown Cemetery
- Party: Anti H-Block

Military service
- Paramilitary: Fianna Éireann (1971–1972); Provisional IRA (1972–1981)
- Rank: Volunteer
- Unit: Belfast Brigade
- Battles/wars: The Troubles

Kieran Doherty (16 October 1955 – 2 August 1981) was an Irish republican hunger striker and politician who served as a TD for Cavan–Monaghan from June 1981 to August 1981. He was a volunteer in the Belfast Brigade of the Provisional Irish Republican Army (IRA).

== Background ==
Doherty was the third son in a family of six. He was born in the Andersonstown area of Belfast. He was educated at St. Theresa's Primary School and Glen Road Christian Brothers School (CBS). The Doherty brothers were known cyclists and sportsmen in the Andersontown area; Kieran won an Antrim Gaelic football medal at minor level in 1971.

Doherty joined Fianna Éireann in Autumn 1971, quickly being recruited into the Provisional IRA thereafter. On 6 October 1972, his home was raided by the British Army and he was detained. He was later released after it was proven he was under 17 and couldn't be interned. The Army returned again ten days later, when he turned 17, but Doherty had been warned and fled across the border to stay with an uncle in Limerick. He eventually returned to Belfast in early 1973.

He was interned by the British Government between February 1973 and November 1975. Kieran's brothers Michael and Terence were interned between 1972 and 1974.

Doherty worked as an apprentice heating engineer. His girlfriend was Geraldine Scheiss; although they never became formally engaged, they became very close towards the end of his life. Before his arrest, she had not known that he was in the IRA.

== Paramilitary activity ==
In August 1976, while he was out to set a bomb, the van he was in was chased by the Royal Ulster Constabulary (RUC). During the chase Doherty managed to leave the van and hijack a car. He later ditched the car some streets away and was found 1 mile (1.6 km) away from the car. He was convicted and sentenced to 18 years for possession of firearms and explosives, with another four years for the hijack.

== Hunger strike ==
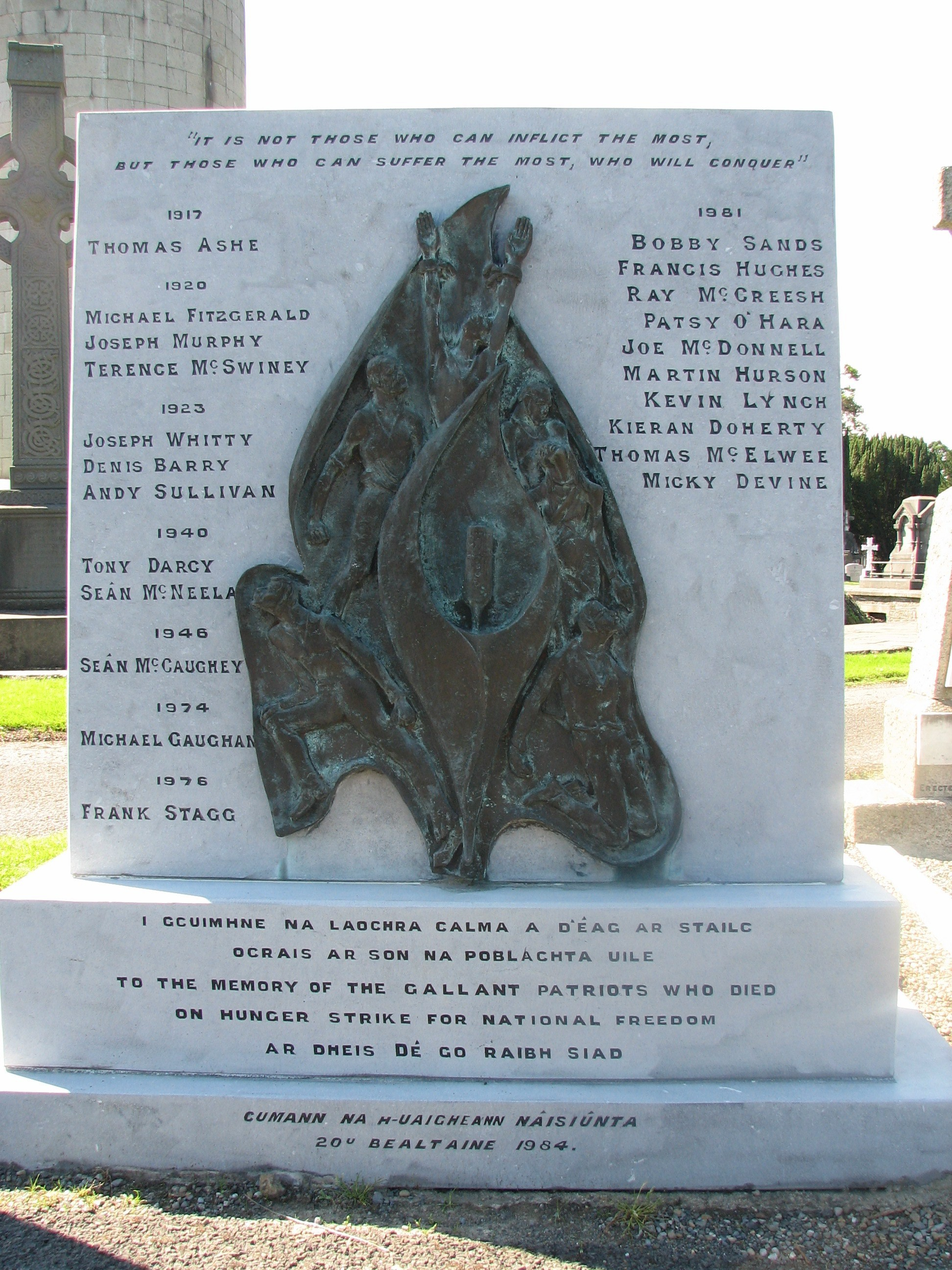
Hunger Strikers Memorial Glasnevin Cemetery Dublin

Doherty began his strike on 22 May. He died at the age of 25 in the 1981 Irish hunger strike in the Maze Prison (known to republicans as Long Kesh). He lasted 73 days on hunger strike, the longest of the 1981 hunger strikers, and only one day short of Terence MacSwiney.

== Election to Dáil Éireann ==
While on hunger strike he was elected as an Anti H-Block TD for Cavan–Monaghan at the 1981 general election, which was held in Ireland on 11 June. He received 9,121 (15.1%) first preference votes and was elected on the fourth count. Doherty is the shortest-serving Dáil deputy ever, having served as a TD for two months. The two seats gained by Anti H-Block candidates denied Taoiseach Charles Haughey the chance to form a government, and the 22nd Dáil saw a Fine Gael-Labour Party coalition government come to office, with Garret FitzGerald as Taoiseach.

== Legacy ==
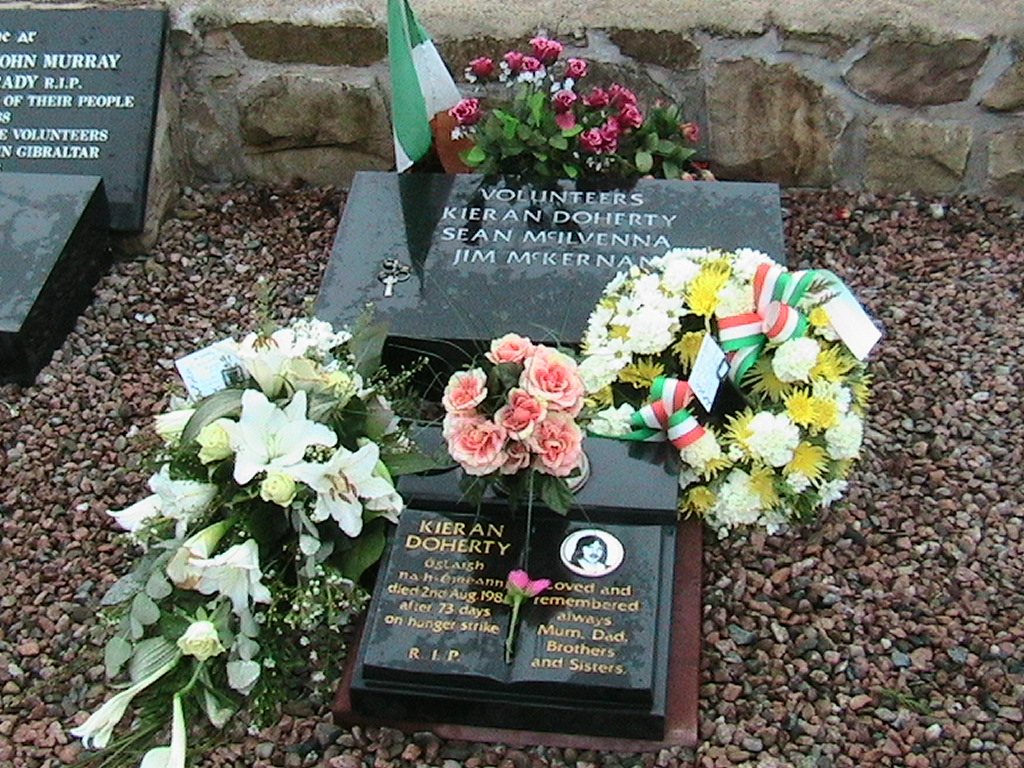
Kieran Doherty memorial in Milltown Cemetery

He is commemorated on the Irish Martyrs Memorial at Waverley Cemetery in Sydney, Australia. Decades earlier, another hunger striker, Joseph Whitty (aged 19), likewise died on 2 August, during the 1923 Irish Hunger Strikes. In October 2016, a painting of him was unveiled in Leinster House by Sinn Féin.

He is buried in the republican plot at Milltown Cemetery in West Belfast.

== See also ==
- List of members of the Oireachtas imprisoned since 1923

Dáil	Election	Deputy (Party)	Deputy (Party)	Deputy (Party)	Deputy (Party)	Deputy (Party)
21st	1977	Jimmy Leonard (FF)	John Wilson (FF)	Thomas J. Fitzpatrick (FG)	Rory O'Hanlon (FF)	John Conlan (FG)
22nd	1981	Kieran Doherty (AHB)	John Wilson (FF)	Thomas J. Fitzpatrick (FG)	Rory O'Hanlon (FF)	John Conlan (FG)
23rd	1982 (Feb)	Jimmy Leonard (FF)	John Wilson (FF)	Thomas J. Fitzpatrick (FG)	Rory O'Hanlon (FF)	John Conlan (FG)
24th	1982 (Nov)	Jimmy Leonard (FF)	John Wilson (FF)	Thomas J. Fitzpatrick (FG)	Rory O'Hanlon (FF)	John Conlan (FG)
25th	1987	Jimmy Leonard (FF)	John Wilson (FF)	Thomas J. Fitzpatrick (FG)	Rory O'Hanlon (FF)	Andrew Boylan (FG)
26th	1989	Jimmy Leonard (FF)	John Wilson (FF)	Bill Cotter (FG)	Rory O'Hanlon (FF)	Andrew Boylan (FG)
27th	1992	Jimmy Leonard (FF)	Brendan Smith (FF)	Seymour Crawford (FG)	Rory O'Hanlon (FF)	Andrew Boylan (FG)
28th	1997	Caoimhghín Ó Caoláin (SF)	Brendan Smith (FF)	Seymour Crawford (FG)	Rory O'Hanlon (FF)	Andrew Boylan (FG)
29th	2002	Caoimhghín Ó Caoláin (SF)	Brendan Smith (FF)	Seymour Crawford (FG)	Rory O'Hanlon (FF)	Paudge Connolly (Ind.)
30th	2007	Caoimhghín Ó Caoláin (SF)	Brendan Smith (FF)	Seymour Crawford (FG)	Rory O'Hanlon (FF)	Margaret Conlon (FF)
31st	2011	Caoimhghín Ó Caoláin (SF)	Brendan Smith (FF)	Heather Humphreys (FG)	Joe O'Reilly (FG)	Seán Conlan (FG)
32nd	2016	Caoimhghín Ó Caoláin (SF)	Brendan Smith (FF)	Heather Humphreys (FG)	Niamh Smyth (FF)	4 seats 2016–2020
33rd	2020	Matt Carthy (SF)	Brendan Smith (FF)	Heather Humphreys (FG)	Niamh Smyth (FF)	Pauline Tully (SF)
34th	2024	Matt Carthy (SF)	Brendan Smith (FF)	David Maxwell (FG)	Niamh Smyth (FF)	Cathy Bennett (SF)
