= Ann Leonard =

Irish politician (born 1969)

Senator
- In office 17 September 1997 – 12 September 2002
- Constituency: Nominated by the Taoiseach

Personal details
- Born: 2 January 1969 (age 57) County Monaghan, Ireland
- Party: Fianna Fáil
- Parent: Jimmy Leonard (father)

Ann Leonard (born 2 January 1969) is a former Fianna Fáil politician from County Monaghan in Ireland. She was a senator from 1997 to 2002, and is the daughter of Jimmy Leonard, a former TD for Cavan–Monaghan.

A paediatric nurse and midwife, Leonard unsuccessfully contested the 1997 general election in Cavan–Monaghan, and after her defeat she was nominated by the Taoiseach Bertie Ahern, to the 21st Seanad. At the 1999 local elections, she was elected to Monaghan County Council for the Clones electoral area, but stood down from the council at the 2004 local elections and did not stand in any further elections.

== See also ==
- Families in the Oireachtas
