= Caoimhghín Ó Caoláin =

Irish former politician (born 1953)

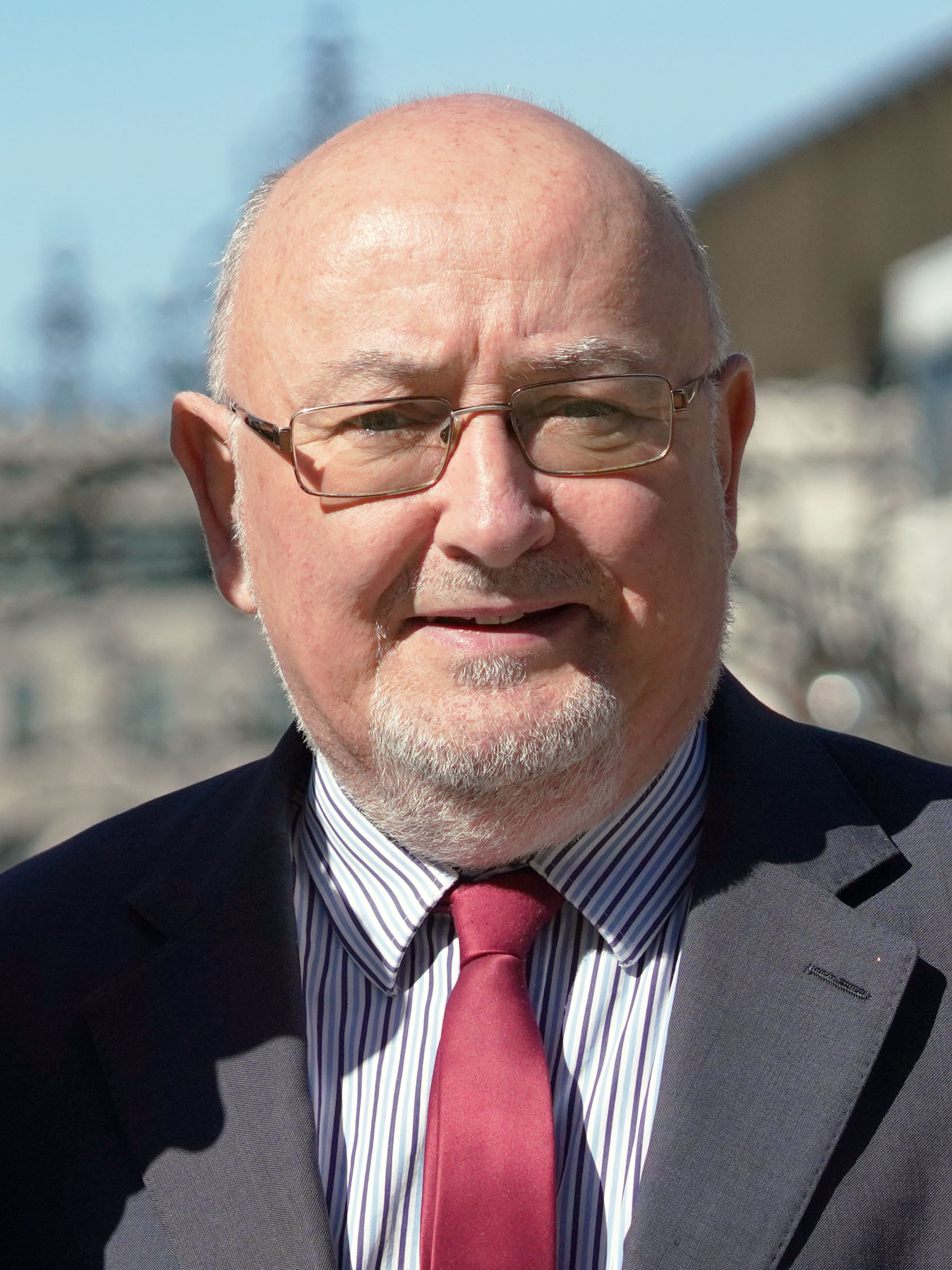
- Ó Caoláin in 2019

Chair of the Committee on Justice and Equality
- In office 4 April 2016 – 14 January 2020
- Preceded by: Niall Collins
- Succeeded by: James Lawless

Leader of Sinn Féin in Dáil Éireann
- In office 22 September 1997 – 9 March 2011
- Leader: Gerry Adams
- Preceded by: New office
- Succeeded by: Gerry Adams

Teachta Dála
- In office June 1997 – February 2020
- Constituency: Cavan–Monaghan

Personal details
- Born: 18 September 1953 (age 72) Monaghan, Ireland
- Party: Sinn Féin
- Spouse: Briege McGinn (m. 1985)
- Children: 5

Caoimhghín Ó Caoláin (Irish pronunciation: [ˈkɰiːvʲiːnʲ oː ˈkɰiːlˠaːnʲ]; born 18 September 1953) is an Irish former Sinn Féin politician who served as a TD for Cavan–Monaghan from 1997 to 2020. Ó Caoláin's victory in 1997 made him the first member of Sinn Féin to be elected to the Dáil since 1957, and the first to actually take their seat since 1922. His election, which paralleled the signing of the Good Friday Agreement in 1998, is cited as the beginning of Sinn Féin's involvement in the formal national politics of the Republic of Ireland.

Ó Caoláin served as Leader of Sinn Féin in Dáil Éireann from 1997 to 2011 and Chair of the Committee on Justice and Equality from 2016 to 2020.

== Biography ==
Ó Caoláin was born in Monaghan in 1953. He was educated at St. Mary's CBS, Monaghan. He was a bank official with the Bank of Ireland in the 1970s, and worked in a number of towns, including Ballinasloe. He became a senior bank official but then left the bank to concentrate on politics. Ó Caoláin is married to Briege McGinn and they have four daughters and one son.

Ó Caoláin underwent successful cardiac surgery early in 2007. On 19 June 2007, it was reported that he was rushed to hospital, but he was released shortly thereafter and has since made a full recovery.

== Political career ==
Ó Caoláin has been active in republican circles since the 1970s. He was Director of Elections in the Anti H-Block campaign of 1981, which saw Kieran Doherty elected as a TD for Cavan–Monaghan. Between 1982 and 1985, he was general manager of the republican newspaper An Phoblacht. Ó Caoláin's first political success came in 1985, when he was elected to Monaghan County Council as a Sinn Féin County Councillor. At the 1984 and 1989 European Parliament elections he stood unsuccessfully in the Connacht–Ulster constituency.

Ó Caoláin was a Sinn Féin delegate at the Forum for Peace and Reconciliation in Dublin in the mid-1990s. In 1996, he was an unsuccessful candidate in the Northern Ireland Forum election in Newry and Armagh. He was also a member of the Sinn Féin negotiations team during the talks which led to the Good Friday Agreement in 1998. Following the 1997 general election, he was elected to Dáil Éireann for the Cavan–Monaghan constituency, making him the first Sinn Féin TD elected since 1957, and the first Sinn Féin TD to take his seat at Dáil Éireann in Leinster House since 1922. He was subsequently re-elected at the 2002 general election and was joined by four other Sinn Féin deputies. He was re-elected at the 2007 general election, 2011 general election and 2016 general election. Ó Caoláin served as Sinn Féin's Spokesperson on Health and Children. While a TD, he accepted the average industrial wage and donated the remaining portion of his TD salary to his party.

On 7 March 2018, Ó Caoláin announced that he would not contest the next general election.

Since his retirement Ó Caoláin has remained involved in Sinn Féin. He was their Director of Elections in his former constituency in 2024.

Party political offices
New office	Leader of Sinn Féin in Dáil Éireann; 1997–2011	Succeeded by Gerry Adams

Dáil	Election	Deputy (Party)	Deputy (Party)	Deputy (Party)	Deputy (Party)	Deputy (Party)
21st	1977	Jimmy Leonard (FF)	John Wilson (FF)	Thomas J. Fitzpatrick (FG)	Rory O'Hanlon (FF)	John Conlan (FG)
22nd	1981	Kieran Doherty (AHB)	John Wilson (FF)	Thomas J. Fitzpatrick (FG)	Rory O'Hanlon (FF)	John Conlan (FG)
23rd	1982 (Feb)	Jimmy Leonard (FF)	John Wilson (FF)	Thomas J. Fitzpatrick (FG)	Rory O'Hanlon (FF)	John Conlan (FG)
24th	1982 (Nov)	Jimmy Leonard (FF)	John Wilson (FF)	Thomas J. Fitzpatrick (FG)	Rory O'Hanlon (FF)	John Conlan (FG)
25th	1987	Jimmy Leonard (FF)	John Wilson (FF)	Thomas J. Fitzpatrick (FG)	Rory O'Hanlon (FF)	Andrew Boylan (FG)
26th	1989	Jimmy Leonard (FF)	John Wilson (FF)	Bill Cotter (FG)	Rory O'Hanlon (FF)	Andrew Boylan (FG)
27th	1992	Jimmy Leonard (FF)	Brendan Smith (FF)	Seymour Crawford (FG)	Rory O'Hanlon (FF)	Andrew Boylan (FG)
28th	1997	Caoimhghín Ó Caoláin (SF)	Brendan Smith (FF)	Seymour Crawford (FG)	Rory O'Hanlon (FF)	Andrew Boylan (FG)
29th	2002	Caoimhghín Ó Caoláin (SF)	Brendan Smith (FF)	Seymour Crawford (FG)	Rory O'Hanlon (FF)	Paudge Connolly (Ind.)
30th	2007	Caoimhghín Ó Caoláin (SF)	Brendan Smith (FF)	Seymour Crawford (FG)	Rory O'Hanlon (FF)	Margaret Conlon (FF)
31st	2011	Caoimhghín Ó Caoláin (SF)	Brendan Smith (FF)	Heather Humphreys (FG)	Joe O'Reilly (FG)	Seán Conlan (FG)
32nd	2016	Caoimhghín Ó Caoláin (SF)	Brendan Smith (FF)	Heather Humphreys (FG)	Niamh Smyth (FF)	4 seats 2016–2020
33rd	2020	Matt Carthy (SF)	Brendan Smith (FF)	Heather Humphreys (FG)	Niamh Smyth (FF)	Pauline Tully (SF)
34th	2024	Matt Carthy (SF)	Brendan Smith (FF)	David Maxwell (FG)	Niamh Smyth (FF)	Cathy Bennett (SF)
