= Francis O'Brien (Irish politician) =

Irish former politician (born 1943)

Senator
- In office 1 November 1989 – 25 May 2011
- Constituency: Agricultural Panel

Personal details
- Born: 7 April 1943 (age 82) Ballybay, County Monaghan, Ireland
- Party: Fianna Fáil
- Spouse: Gertrude Smith
- Children: 4

Francis O'Brien (born 7 April 1943) is an Irish former Fianna Fáil politician. He was a senator from 1989 to 2011, elected by the Agricultural Panel.

== Political career ==
O'Brien is a native of Latton, near Ballybay, in County Monaghan. He was a member of Monaghan County Council from 1979 until 2003, serving as Council chairman in 1986 to 1987. O'Brien was elected to the Seanad in 1989, but did not contest the 2011 Seanad election.

== Business career ==
In 2006, according to an article by the Irish Independent, O'Brien obtained loans amounting to millions of euros in order to buy 17 acres (6.9 ha) of agricultural land outside the village of Inniskeen, County Monaghan in the hope that it would be rezoned for housing. However, the Inniskeen Action Committee opposed the development and, despite several Fianna Fáil councillors voting for the rezoning, the motion was defeated (12 votes to seven) by Fine Gael and Sinn Féin councillors. By 2010, the land was worth a fraction of the purchase price. During a subsequent hearing at the commercial court in 2010, it was revealed that O'Brien owed around €13 million to various creditors, but only had assets amounting to €430,000. It was also revealed that Irish Nationwide had loaned O'Brien €4.47 million in 2006 to purchase the land in Inniskeen.

== Criminal conviction ==
=== Background to arrest ===
In January 2012, a Cavan based veterinary inspector named Michael Heelan approached O'Brien for advice after he was accused by Louth County Council of illegal dumping. Heelan had previously been reprimanded by the Department of Agriculture of improper disposal of used veterinary items (needles, surplus blood, empty bottles, etc ...) and was worried the latest allegations would effect his employment. On 13 April 2012, O'Brien contacted Heelan and claimed that more used veterinary items belonging to him had been discovered illegally dumped in Carrickmacross. O'Brien offered to help Heelan in covering up the find for a sum of money and contacted him several times over the following 2 weeks to negotiate payment terms.

=== Garda investigation ===
Fearing for his job, Heelan then contacted the Gardai, who arranged for further phone calls of payment negotiations with O'Brien to be recorded. On 27 April 2012, Heelan was fitted with a covert recording device, which was being monitored by Gardai, and met O'Brien to discuss the handover of the supposed used veterinary items. O'Brien then made a handsfree call in his car to the person who allegedly discovered the items, and was directed to a shed on the north side of Carrickmacross (in Tullyvaragh Lower townland) where the items could be retrieved. Gardai then moved in and arrested O'Brien. On 24 April 2013, O'Brien was charged with demanding €100,000 with menaces and remanded on bail.

=== Sentencing ===
In November 2013, O'Brien was sentenced to two years' imprisonment and a further year suspended, after pleading guilty to a charge of demanding €100,000 with menaces from Michael Heelan at Carrickmacross on 27 April 2012. Judge John O'Hagan described the extortion attempt as "an abominable scheme".

=== Co-accused acquitted ===
In a separate trial, on 9 October 2015 the man O'Brien allegedly called from his car to get the location of the illegally dumped items was acquitted by the direction of the judge of charges of blackmail, extortion and demanding money with menaces. The prosecution's case consisted of Heelan asserting that the man's name had appeared on O'Brien's phone and testimony from Garda Superintendent Traynor, who was listening to the live audio from the covert recording device, that he instantly recognised the man's voice as he had known him in a personal capacity for many years previously. However, the judge ruled that although the Gardai had legal authorisation to make covert recordings of conversations within the car, they did not have permission to intercept telecommunications via the device, therefore any evidence gathered from O'Brien's phone conversation was inadmissible. As a result, the prosecution had no evidence to offer and the case was dismissed.
