= List of highways numbered 37 =

The following highways are numbered 37:

== Australia ==
- Newcastle Inner City Bypass
- Nubeena Road (TAS)
- Fitzsimons Lane / Williamsons Road (VIC)

== Canada ==
- Alberta Highway 37
- British Columbia Highway 37
- Winnipeg Route 37
- Ontario Highway 37
- Saskatchewan Highway 37
- Yukon Highway 37

== Czech Republic ==
- I/37 Highway; Czech: Silnice I/37

== Iceland ==
- Route 37 (Iceland)

== India ==
- National Highway 37 (India)

== Iran ==
- Road 37

== Italy ==
- Strada statale 37 del Maloja

== Japan ==
- Japan National Route 37

== Korea, South ==
- Second Jungbu Expressway
- National Route 37
- Gukjido 37

== Malaysia ==
- East–West Link Expressway
- Kuala Lumpur–Seremban Expressway
- FT 37 Rawang Bypass

== New Zealand ==
- New Zealand State Highway 37

== Poland ==
- National road 37

== United Kingdom ==
- A37 (Great Britain)
- A37 (Coleraine-Limavady, Northern Ireland)
- A37 (Cullaville, Northern Ireland)

== United States ==
- Interstate 37
  - Interstate 37 (Illinois) (former proposal)
- U.S. Route 37 (former)
- Alabama State Route 37
  - County Route 37 (Lee County, Alabama)
- Arkansas Highway 37
- California State Route 37
  - County Route J37 (California)
- Colorado State Highway 37 (former)
- Connecticut Route 37
- Delaware Route 37
- Florida State Road 37
- Georgia State Route 37
- Hawaii Route 37
- Idaho State Highway 37
- Illinois Route 37
- Indiana State Road 37
- Iowa Highway 37
- K-37 (Kansas highway)
- Kentucky Route 37 (former)
- Louisiana Highway 37
- Maine State Route 37
- Maryland Route 37 (former)
- Massachusetts Route 37
  - Massachusetts Route C37 (former)
- M-37 (Michigan highway)
- Minnesota State Highway 37
  - County Road 37 (Cass County, Minnesota)
  - County Road 37 (Ramsey County, Minnesota)
  - County Road 37 (St. Louis County, Minnesota)
- Mississippi Highway 37
- Missouri Route 37
- Montana Highway 37
- Nebraska Highway 37 (former)
- Nevada State Route 37 (former)
- New Jersey Route 37
  - County Route 37 (Bergen County, New Jersey)
    - County Route S37 (Bergen County, New Jersey)
  - County Route 37 (Monmouth County, New Jersey)
- New Mexico State Road 37
- New York State Route 37
  - County Route 37 (Broome County, New York)
  - County Route 37 (Chautauqua County, New York)
  - County Route 37 (Chemung County, New York)
  - County Route 37 (Chenango County, New York)
  - County Route 37 (Delaware County, New York)
  - County Route 37 (Dutchess County, New York)
  - County Route 37 (Erie County, New York)
  - County Route 37 (Franklin County, New York)
  - County Route 37 (Jefferson County, New York)
  - County Route 37 (Oneida County, New York)
  - County Route 37 (Ontario County, New York)
  - County Route 37 (Orleans County, New York)
  - County Route 37 (Oswego County, New York)
  - County Route 37 (Putnam County, New York)
  - County Route 37 (Rensselaer County, New York)
  - County Route 37 (Rockland County, New York)
  - County Route 37 (Schenectady County, New York)
  - County Route 37 (St. Lawrence County, New York)
  - County Route 37 (Steuben County, New York)
  - County Route 37 (Suffolk County, New York)
  - County Route 37 (Washington County, New York)
- North Carolina Highway 37
- North Dakota Highway 37
- Ohio State Route 37
- Oklahoma State Highway 37
- Oregon Route 37
- Pennsylvania Route 37 (former)
- Rhode Island Route 37
- South Carolina Highway 37
- South Dakota Highway 37
- Tennessee State Route 37
- Texas State Highway 37
  - Texas State Highway Loop 37 (former)
  - Texas State Highway Spur 37
  - Farm to Market Road 37
  - Texas Park Road 37
- Utah State Route 37
- Virginia State Route 37
  - Virginia State Route 37 (former)
- West Virginia Route 37
- Wisconsin Highway 37
- Wyoming Highway 37

Territories

- Puerto Rico Highway 37
- U.S. Virgin Islands Highway 37

== See also ==
- A37#Roads
- List of highways numbered 37A

Preceded by 36	Lists of highways 37	Succeeded by 38
