= Speed limits in South Korea =

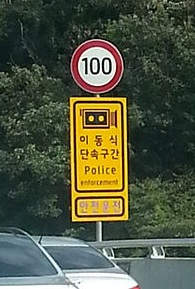
A speed limit sign on an Expressway in South Korea, with warning signs of a speed camera.

In South Korea, speed limits are controlled at the national level by Article 19 of the Enforcement Regulations of the Road Traffic Act, although speed limits can be lowered if deemed necessary, or if they are going through cities, towns, villages, or school zones.

== Limit types ==
In some cases, the speed on some expressways is limited to 80 km/h, so there are some expressways with speeds that are strictly limited to the level of automobile-only roads such as South Korea's Olympic-daero, Gangbyeon-buk-ro, and Beonyeong-ro. These speed limits are as follows:

- General roads (National roads or provincial roads, and roads that are not motorways or expressways)
  - 60 km/h (37 mph) for one lane per direction.
  - 80 km/h (50 mph) for two or more lanes per direction.
- Motorways (Roads for cars only, usually a national route)
  - 90 km/h (56 mph), with a minimum speed of 30 km/h (19 mph).
- Expressways (Equivalent to freeways and European motorways)
  - 80 km/h (50 mph) for one lane per direction, with a minimum speed of 50 km/h (31 mph), regardless of vehicle type. All previously one lane per direction expressways in South Korea have been converted to those with two lanes per direction.
  - 100 km/h (62 mph) for two or more lanes per direction, with a minimum speed of 50 km/h (31 mph). This speed limit is lowered to 80 km/h (50 mph) for trucks, dangerous good vehicles, and construction machinery with a loaded weight exceeding 1.5 tons. Refers to a vehicle that transports dangerous substances according to Note 6 of Attached Table 9 of the Enforcement Rules of the Road Traffic Act.
  - 110 km/h (68 mph) or 120 km/h (75 mph) for roads that have been evaluated by the Commissioner of the National Police Agency and deemed safe for a higher speed limit. These roads have a minimum speed of 50 km/h (31 mph) or 60 km/h (37 mph), and a speed limit of 90 km/h (56 mph) for trucks, dangerous goods vehicles, and construction machinery with a loaded weight exceeding 1.5 tons. There are currently no roads with a speed limit of 120 km/h (75 mph) in the country, but there have been discussions of changing the speed limit of certain sections of expressways to 120 km/h (75 mph).

== Speed limit sections ==
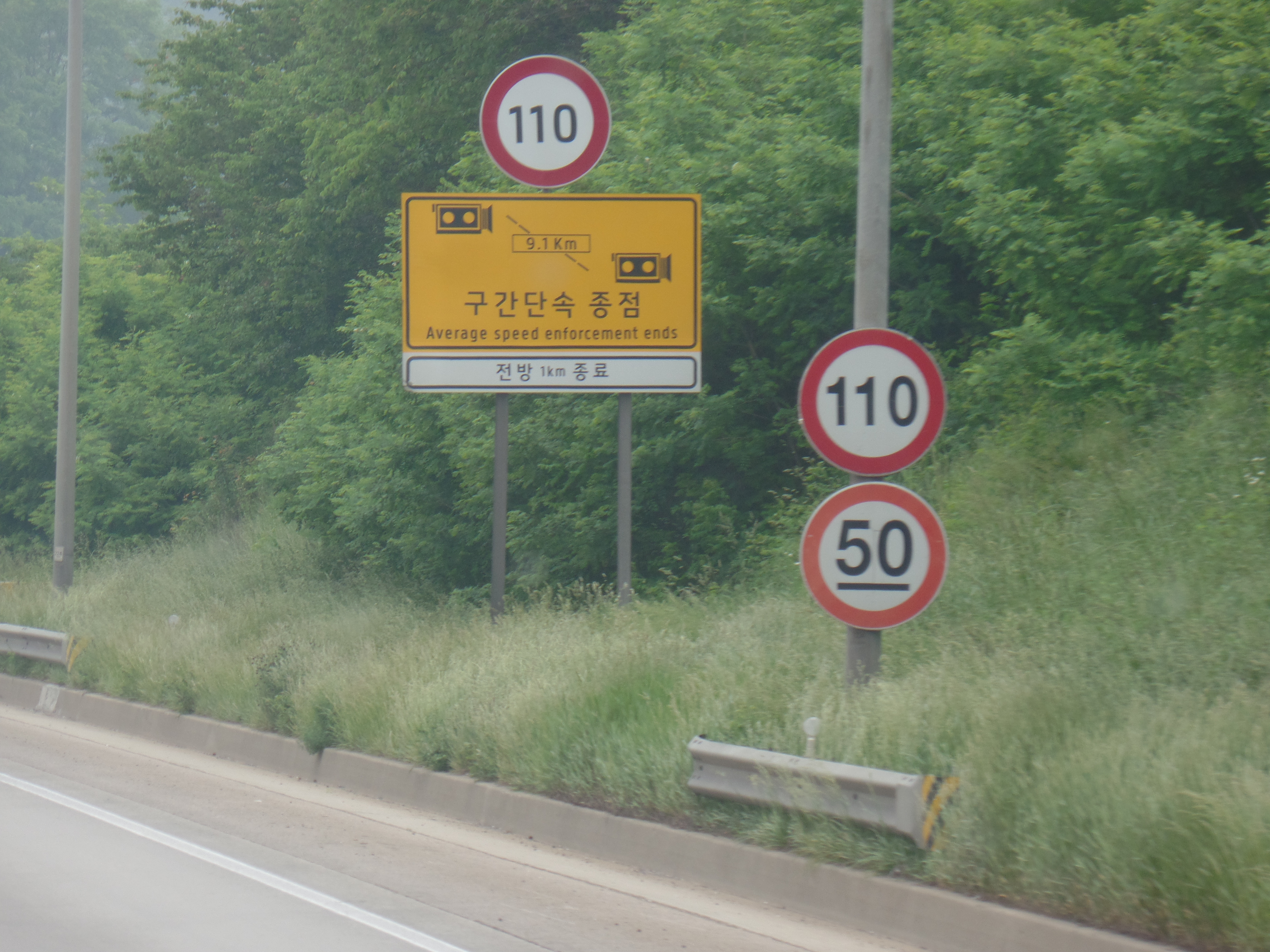
A speed limit sign of 110 km/h on the Seohaean Expressway between Songak IC and W Pyeongtaek IC.

=== Sections of expressways with a speed limit of 80 km/h (does not include urban expressways) ===
Gyeongbu Expressway (Cheonan Junction to Mokcheon IC)

Donghae Expressway (Haeundae Viewpoint to Haeundae IC)

Muan-Gwangju Expressway (Bukmuan IC to Muan Airport IC)

Yeongdong Expressway (Incheon direction Hoengseong rest area to Saemal IC)

Jungang Expressway (Chuncheon rest area to Chuncheon TG)

Jungang Expressway (Daegam JC Main Line Chuncheon to Busan)

Pyeongtaek-Paju Expressway (Sandan IC to Naepo IC)

Honam Expressway Branch (Beolgok Service Area to Gyeryong IC)

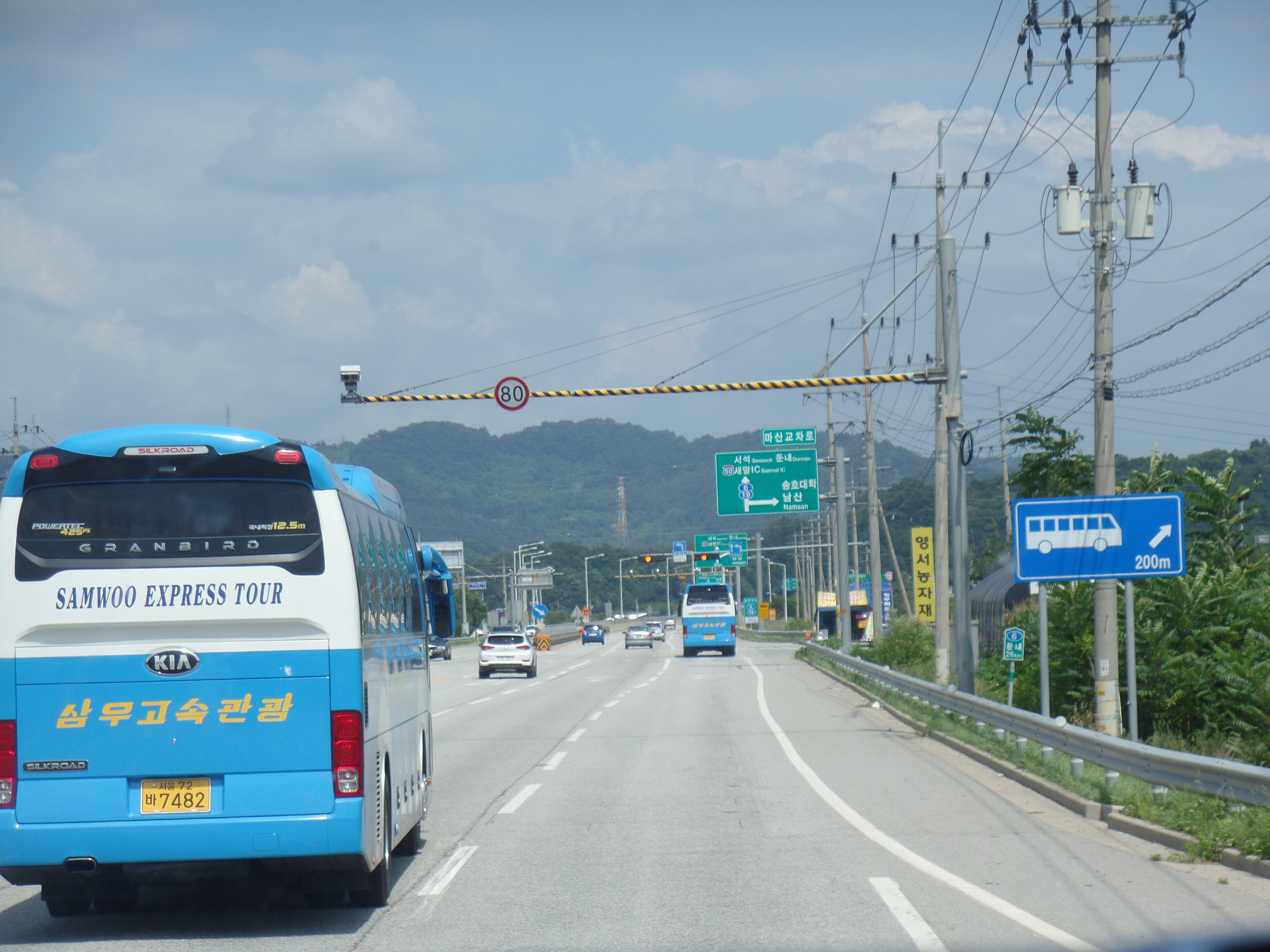
80 km/h speed limit on National Route 6 (not an expressway)

Daegu Outer Ring Expressway (All sections)

=== Sections of expressways with a speed limit of 110 km/h ===
Gyeongbu Expressway (Cheonan IC ~ Yangjae IC section)

Seohaean Expressway (Juknim JC ~ Maesong IC section)

Nonsan-Cheonan Expressway

Seosan-Yeongdeok Expressway (Dangjin JC ~ Yuseong JC, Cheongju JC ~ Nakdong JC)

Jungbu Expressway

Second Jungbu Expressway

Jungbu Naeryuk Expressway (Nakdong JC to North Yeoju IC)

Jungang Expressway (Daegu-Busan Expressway) (Daedong JC to Dongdaegu JC)

Seocheon Gongju Expressway (Seocheon Tunnel ~ Seogongju JC)

== Enforcement ==
Speed limits in most areas are enforced exclusively by speed cameras instead of police officers. There is a tolerance of 10 km/h over the posted limit and reduced fines for exceeding the limit by 11 - 20 km/h. Because of this, many Korean drivers consider the limit to be 11 km/h above the posted limit, meaning that a speed limit of 110 km/h may be treated as a speed limit of 121 km/h.
