= Expressway 35 (South Korea) =

Expressway 35 may refer to the following roads in South Korea:

- Tongyeong–Daejeon Expressway : Tongyeong, South Gyeongsang ~ Dong District, Daejeon
- Jungbu Expressway : Cheongju, North Chungcheong ~ Hanam, Gyeonggi
