= Inniskeen railway station =

Station in County Monaghan, Ireland

Inniskeen Inis Caoin
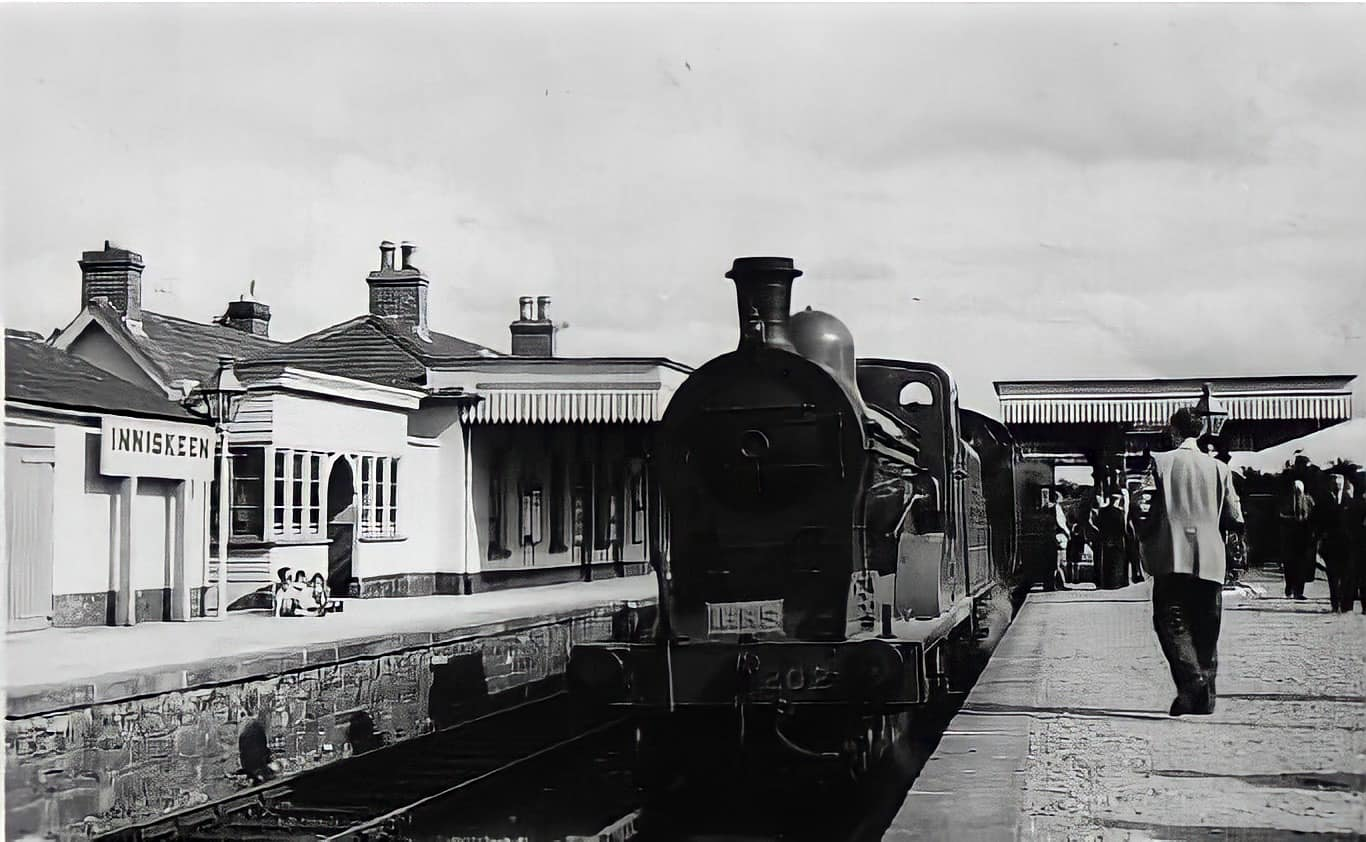
- 202 ‘Louth' in Inniskeen Railway Station

General information
- Location: Inniskeen; County Monaghan; Ireland
- Coordinates: 54.004264°N 6.575387°W
- Elevation: 170 ft (52 m)
- Lines: Inniskeen to Carrickmacross line Dundalk to Enniskillen line
- Platforms: 2
- Tracks: 2

Construction
- Structure type: At-grade

History
- Original company: Dundalk and Enniskillen Railway
- Pre-grouping: Great Northern Railway (Ireland)

Key dates
- 1 April 1851: Station opens
- 14 October 1957: Station closes to passengers
- 1 January 1960: Station closes completely
Location

Inniskeen railway station was on the Dundalk and Enniskillen Railway in the Republic of Ireland.

== History ==
The Dundalk and Enniskillen Railway opened the station on 1 April 1851. The station consisted of a substantial station house (extant), platforms, crane, turntable, water tank, goods shed and was also the junction for Carrickmacross.

The station was closed to passengers on 14 October 1957 following the closure of most of the GNRI's cross-border lines, but remained open for occasional goods and excursion traffic in the Republic until 1 January 1960.

== Routes ==
Preceding station	Disused railways	Following station
Dundalk	Dundalk and Enniskillen Railway; Dundalk to Enniskillen 1851-1925	Culloville
Kellybridge Halt	Great Northern Railway (Ireland); Dundalk to Enniskillen 1925-1927	Culloville
Kellybridge Halt	Great Northern Railway (Ireland); Dundalk to Enniskillen 1927-1957	Blackstaff Halt
Terminus	Great Northern Railway (Ireland); Inniskeen to Carrickmacross	Essexford
