= Blackstaff =

Blackstaff may refer to:

- An electoral ward of Belfast in Northern Ireland.
- Blackstaff River, a watercourse in County Antrim, Northern Ireland.
- Blackstaff Press, a publishing company in Northern Ireland.
- Blackstaff Halt railway station, a defunct railway station in the Republic of Ireland.
- A title and name given to characters who own the eponymous staff and Blackstaff Tower in the fictional Forgotten Realms setting
