= Gerry Murphy (weather forecaster) =

Irish meteorologist with Met Éireann (born 1969)

- Born: 1968 or 1969 (age 56–57); Carrickmacross, County Monaghan, Ireland
- Education: University College Dublin
- Occupation: Meteorologist
- Employer: Met Éireann
- Television: RTÉ Weather

Gerry Murphy (born 1968 or 1969) is an Irish meteorologist with Met Éireann, best known for his appearances on RTÉ.

After graduating with a degree in Experimental Physics from University College Dublin in 1990, Murphy joined Met Éireann in 1992. He received meteorological training in Reading and experience in aviation forecasting at Shannon Airport, before being 'chief scientist' at Valentia Observatory from 1993 to 1999.

Murphy returned to Dublin in 1999, and worked as Met Éireann's agricultural meteorologist until 2001. He has worked as a forecaster in Met Éireann's Central Analysis and Forecasting Office (CAFO) since 2001, and as a weather presenter on RTÉ Television since November 2001.
