= Essexford railway station =

Railway station in Ireland

Essexford

General information
- Location: Essexford, County Louth; Ireland
- Coordinates: 53.98°N 6.64°W

History
- Original company: Great Northern Railway (Ireland)
- Post-grouping: Great Northern Railway (Ireland)

Key dates
- 1 October 1887: Station opens
- 10 March 1947: Station closes
Location
- Location within Ireland

Essexford railway station was on the Great Northern Railway (Ireland) in the Republic of Ireland.

The Great Northern Railway (Ireland) opened the station on 1 October 1887.

It closed on 10 March 1947.

== Routes ==
Preceding station	Disused railways	Following station
Inniskeen	Great Northern Railway (Ireland); Inniskeen to Carrickmacross	Carrickmacross
