= Kellybridge Halt railway station =

Disused railway halt in County Louth, Ireland

Kellybridge Halt

General information
- Location: Killycroney, near Dundalk; County Louth; Ireland
- Coordinates: 53.995708°N 6.504092°W
- Elevation: 171 ft (52 m)
- Line: Dundalk–Enniskillen railway line
- Platforms: 1

Construction
- Structure type: At-grade

History
- Original company: Great Northern Railway (Ireland)

Key dates
- 1 October 1925: Opened
- 1 September 1953: Transferred to the Great Northern Railway Board
- 14 October 1957: Closed

Historical railways
Preceding station	Historical railways	Following station
Dundalk; Line and station open on the Dublin–Belfast main line	Great Northern Railway (Ireland); Dundalk–Enniskillen (1925–1953)	Inniskeen; Line and station closed
Dundalk; Line and station open on the Dublin–Belfast main line	Great Northern Railway Board; Dundalk–Enniskillen (1953–1957)	Inniskeen; Line and station closed
Location
- Location within island of Ireland

Kellybridge Halt railway station was a railway halt in County Louth, Ireland, on the former Dundalk–Enniskillen railway line. It was located near Killycroney Bridge, between Dundalk and Inniskeen. The halt opened on 1 October 1925 and closed on 14 October 1957.

== History ==
Kellybridge Halt was opened by the Great Northern Railway (Ireland) (GNR) on 1 October 1925, according to the Irish Railway Stations Index. However, an industrial heritage survey commissioned by Louth and Monaghan county councils gives its opening year as 1924.

The halt was located on the Dundalk-Enniskillen railway line, between Dundalk and Inniskeen, and consisted of a single passenger platform situated immediately south-east of Killycroney Bridge.

On 1 September 1953, the Great Northern Railway's operations were transferred to the jointly administered Great Northern Railway Board, following the acquisition of the company by the governments of Ireland and Northern Ireland.

Kellybridge Halt closed to passenger services on 14 October 1957, following the withdrawal of services on the Dundalk-Clones railway line.

A photograph dated 6 April 1955, included in the Louth and Monaghan railway heritage survey, shows a Clones-Dundalk train at the halt.

== Location and remains ==
The halt stood at the south-eastern corner of Killycroney Bridge, which carried a road over the former railway line. The bridge survives and is recorded in the National Inventory of Architectural Heritage as a nineteenth-century limestone railway overbridge.

A photograph of the platform taken by James P. O'Dea on 28 December 1959, more than two years after the closure of passenger services, is held in the National Library of Ireland's O'Dea Photograph Collection.

A survey conducted on 3 August 2007 found that no visible remains of the platform survived.

== See also ==
- Dundalk Clarke railway station
- Inniskeen railway station
- Great Northern Railway (Ireland)
