= A37 =

A37, A 37, A.37 or A-37 may refer to:

== Roads ==
- A37 road (England), a road connecting Dorchester, Dorset and Bristol
- A37 road (South) (Northern Ireland), a short road connecting the N53 road in the Republic of Ireland, which is the main road between Castleblaney and Dundalk
- A37 road (North) (Northern Ireland), a road connecting Coleraine and Limavady
- A 37 motorway (Germany), a road connecting the borough of Hannover-Buchholz and Burgdorf via Altwarmbüchen and the Hanover fairground to the A7
- A37 road (Isle of Man), or Marine Drive Road
- A37 motorway (Netherlands), a road connecting Hoogeveen with Emmen and the German border near Zwartemeer
- A-37 (Michigan county highway), a road in Michigan connecting Allegan and Hudsonville

== Other ==
- A37, one of the English Opening codes in the Encyclopaedia of Chess Openings
- Cessna A-37 Dragonfly, a light attack jet aircraft
- Samsung Galaxy A37 5G, a mid-range Android smartphone
- Saunders Roe A.37 Shrimp, a 1939 British two-seat four-engined experimental flying boat
