= Singal Junction =

Road junction in Gyeonggi, South Korea

- 신갈 분기점, 新葛分岐點

Location
- Giheung-gu, Yongin, Gyeonggi, South Korea
- Coordinates: 37°17′24.24″N 127°6′13.41″E
- Roads at junction: Gyeongbu Expressway ( AH 1); Yeongdong Expressway

Construction
- Type: Combination interchange
- Constructed: by Korea Expressway Corporation
- Opened: November 29, 1991

- Singal Junction
- Hangul: 신갈 분기점
- Hanja: 新葛分岐點
- Revised Romanization: Singal Bungijeom
- McCune–Reischauer: Sin'gal Pun'gichŏm

Singal Junction (신갈 분기점), also known as the Singal JC, is a junction located in Giheung-gu, Yongin, Gyeonggi, South Korea. Gyeongbu Expressway (No. 1) and Yeongdong Expressway (No. 50) meet here. It is named after the neighbourhood in which it is located, Singal-dong. The type of junction is combination interchange. It is Sin-gal Junction, not Sing-al Junction.
