= N53 road (Ireland) =

Road in Ireland

N53 road
- Bóthar N53
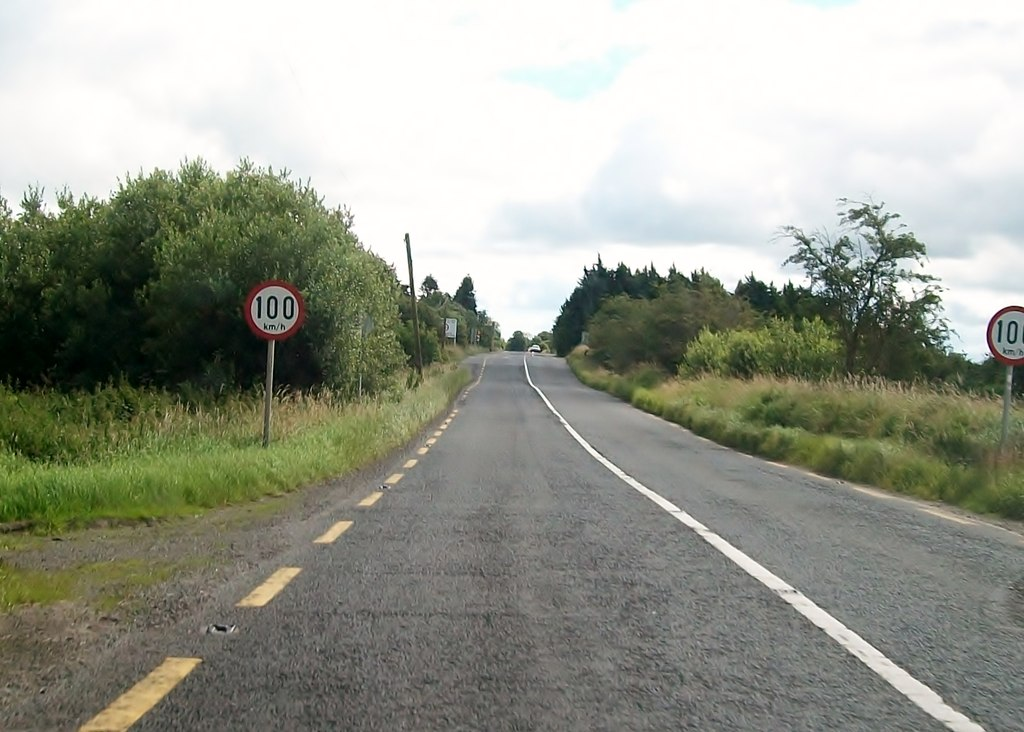
- The N53 at the Armagh / Louth border, entering the Republic

Route information
- Length: 17.5 km (10.9 mi)

Location
- Country: Ireland
- Primary destinations: County Louth; Dundalk; County Monaghan; Castleblayney

Highway system
- Roads in Ireland; Motorways; Primary; Secondary; Regional

The N53 road is a national secondary road in Ireland, running from Dundalk, County Louth, to Castleblayney, County Monaghan, but with a short gap where it crosses the Republic of Ireland–United Kingdom border and runs through Northern Ireland.

The road was established before the partition of Ireland and became Concession Road in Northern Ireland owing to its lack of formal custom facilities. The cross-border location of the N53 has attracted businesses taking advantage of different laws and taxes, but also created problems following Brexit, including the potential for border facilities along the road.

== Route ==
The N53 is 23.5 kilometres (14.6 mi) long, including the section in Northern Ireland. It runs from junction 17 of the M1 at Newtownbalregan just outside Dundalk, County Louth, to the N2 bypass of Castleblayney, County Monaghan. For 6 kilometres (3.7 mi) (between Rassan, County Louth, and Ballynacarry Bridge, County Monaghan) the road passes through Cullaville, County Armagh, Northern Ireland, where it is classified as the A37 and known as the Concession Road. The southern border crossing is at a tripoint of Counties Armagh, Monaghan and Louth.

== History ==
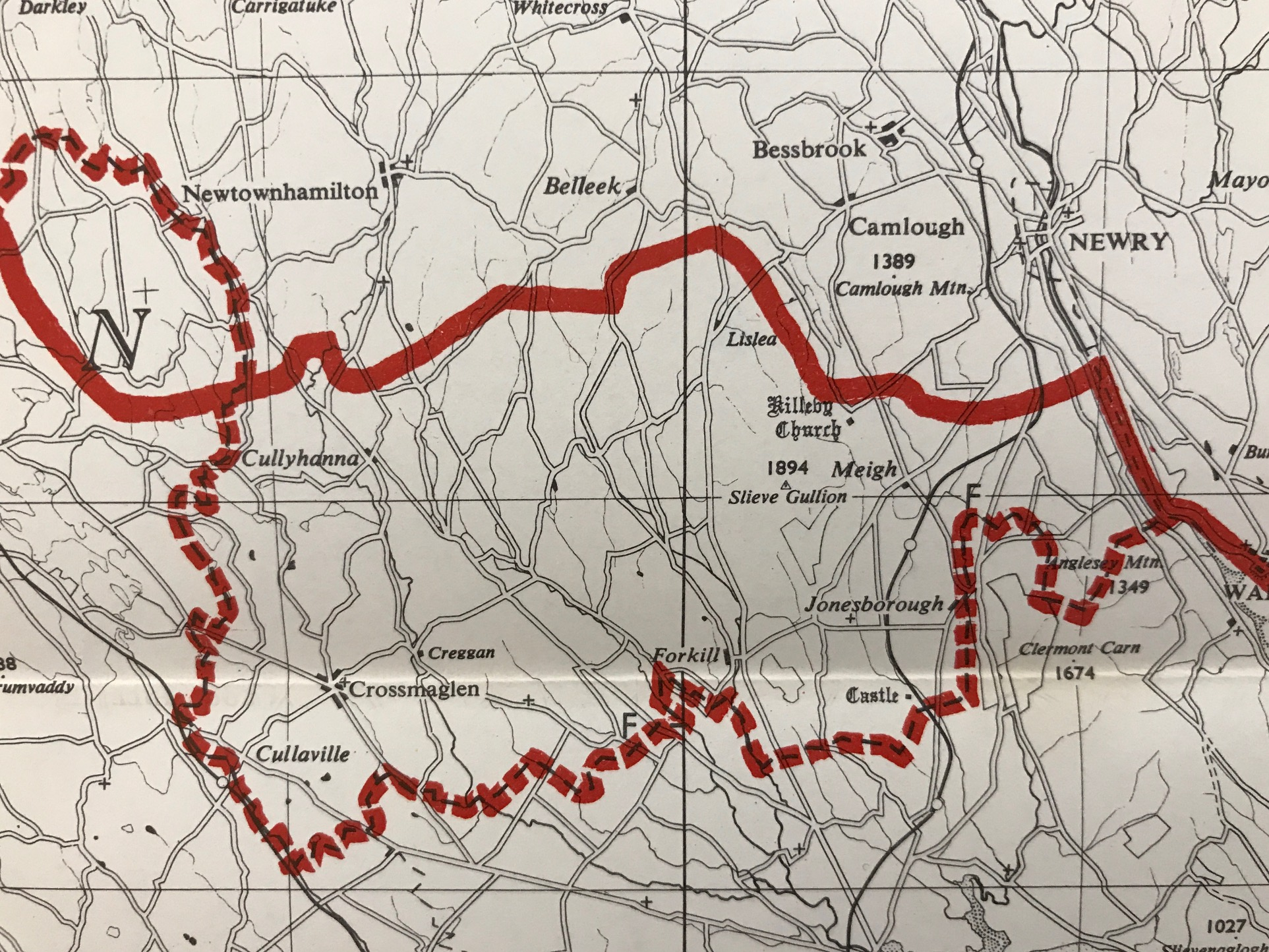
Irish Boundary Commission map of Amargh and Monaghan, showing the N53 running entirely in the Republic

The road pre-dates the partition of Ireland in 1921. It is mentioned in Samuel Lewis' A Topographical Dictionary of Ireland (1837), which describes the parish of Castletown as "on the bay of Dundalk, and on the roads leading respectively to Castle-Blayney and Armagh". It was never intended to be a cross-border road; had the border been defined by the Irish Boundary Commission's recommendations instead of existing county boundaries, the road would have been entirely in the Republic.

Concession Road was named because there were no customs at the border, and vehicles in the Republic were allowed to travel from Dundalk to Castleblayney without having to stop for checks. Legally, nobody living in Northern Ireland was allowed to cross the border using the N53, and should have used a manned crossing. In practice, locals used the road anyway. A formal customs post existed just south of Cullaville at Kingham's Bridge by the River Fane. It was destroyed by the Provisional IRA in 1971.

On 6 February 1972, a British soldier, David Seaman, was found dead on the road in a suspected IRA activity. In December 1976, a woman was driving along the road when she collided with a lorry hijacked by the IRA.

== Safety ==
The N53 has a poor safety record, and has been described as an "accident blackspot". Various widening and bypass proposals have been put forward. In 2011, a councillor complained that the road around Dundalk was unsafe to walk on, because of a lack of pedestrian access.

In 2013, the contracting firm MDM were consulted by both Monaghan County Council and the Northern Ireland Department of Regional Development on a new bridge crossing the River Fane, diverting from Ballynacarry Bridge.

In 2018, a section of N53 from Rassan to Hackballscross was closed for a month, for major restructuring works.

In December 2022, a man was killed while driving on the N53 close to the border, when he was hit by a car. Police suggested the incident may be linked to a murder in Castleblayney that took place shortly before.

== Commerce ==
The road's geography, connecting two points in the Republic via Northern Ireland has made it popular for businesses taking advantages of the two countries' different taxes. The Concession Road has nine fuel outlets, both catering for long-distance traffic and agricultural diesel. There are also a number of off licences, car sales and fireworks shops.

== Brexit ==
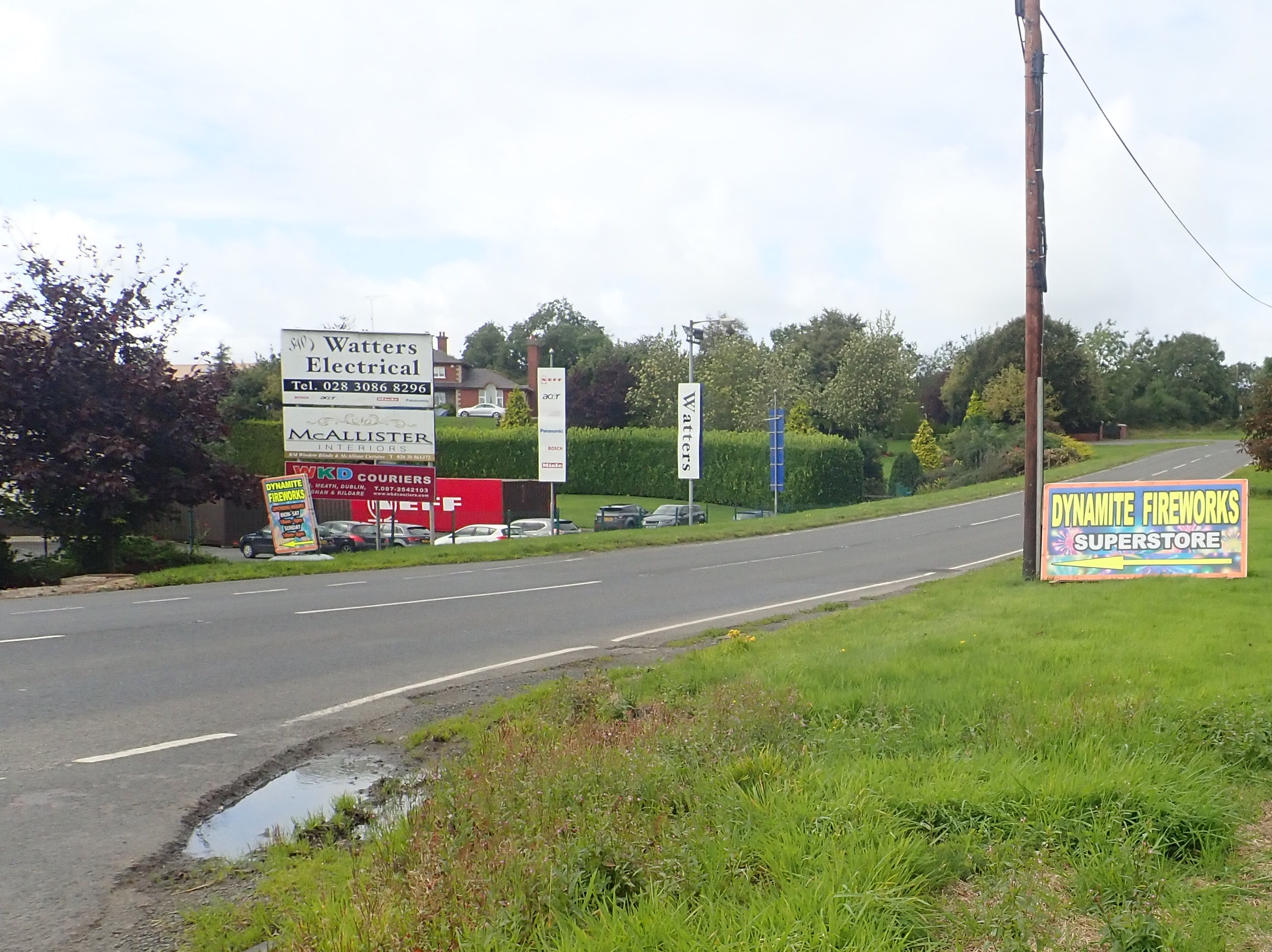
The Concession Road contains several shops selling fireworks, which are illegal to sell over the counter in the Republic.

Following the 2016 United Kingdom European Union membership referendum, in which the United Kingdom voted to leave the European Union, concern was raised over whether formal border posts should appear on the N53, as it would form an external border with the EU, which is opposed by local residents in Amargh. In 2017, the EU's chief negotiator Michel Barnier was photographed on the southern section of the N53 by the border.

In 2018, the EU Exit Analysis Branch identified fifteen main roads, including the N53, which could be used as a key border inspection point should a hard Brexit occur.

At a 2022 Louth County Council meeting, discussing safety improvements to the N53, a local councillor remarked there was still a possibility of border checks on the road being required, depending on the progression of the Northern Ireland Protocol designed to facilitate post-Brexit trade between Northern Ireland and the Republic. He quipped that the road could become the "Boris Johnson junction" if checkpoints would be required, or the "Martin McGuinness motorway" if the fallout of Brexit ultimately led to a United Ireland.

== See also ==
- Drummully, another cross-border traffic area
