= Culloville railway station =

Railway station in County Monaghan, Ireland

Culloville

General information
- Location: Corcumonglish; Culloville, County Monaghan; Ireland

History
- Original company: Dundalk and Enniskillen Railway
- Post-grouping: Great Northern Railway (Ireland)

Key dates
- 1 April 1851: Station opens
- 14 October 1957: Station closes to passengers
- 1 June 1958: Station closes completely
Location

Culloville railway station was on the Dundalk and Enniskillen Railway in the Republic of Ireland.

== History ==
The Dundalk and Enniskillen Railway opened the station on 1 April 1851.

It closed to passenger traffic on 14 October 1957 when the Northern Ireland Government forced the Great Northern Railway Board to close its cross-border lines. The North Western line survived for goods in the Republic until CIÉ closed it on 1 January 1960, while Culloville station had closed on 1 June 1958.

== Routes ==
Preceding station	Disused railways	Following station
Inniskeen	Dundalk and Enniskillen Railway; Dundalk to Enniskillen 1851-1927	Castleblayney
Blackstaff Halt	Great Northern Railway (Ireland); Dundalk to Enniskillen 1927-1957	Castleblayney
