= Bernard Duffy =

Irish barrister, novelist and playwright

- Born: 19 June 1882; Carrickmacross
- Died: 31 March 1952 (aged 69); Carrickmacross
- Occupations: Barrister, novelist

Bernard Joseph Duffy (19 June 1882 – 31 March 1952) was an Irish barrister, novelist and playwright.

Duffy was born in Carrickmacross to James Joseph Duffy and Mary Anne McEntagart. He was educated at Viscount Weymouth Grammar School and obtained his M.A. from Trinity College Dublin. He was called to the Irish bar in 1907 and worked as a barrister for eight years. He retired to manage his father's mineral-water business. He authored two novels Oriel (1918) and The Rocky Road (1929) and twelve plays. Duffy was on the executive committee of the Dublin Drama League and was involved in establishing the Irish Drama Union in 1919. His plays were produced at the Abbey Theatre.

Duffy spent several years conducting laboratory work at Dublin University; he was interested in dream research. In 1944, he authored his only non-fiction work, Food for Thought: A Treatise on Memory, Dreams and Hallucinations. The book defends a type of animism, arguing against materialism. Duffy stated that the mind has an independent existence from the brain and interacts with it through the medium of a third substance.

== Selected publications ==
Novels

- Oriel (1918)
- The Rocky Road (1929)

Non-fiction

- Food for Thought: A Treatise on Memory, Dreams and Hallucinations (1944)

Plays

- The Coiner (1915)
- Fraternity (1916)
- Oriel (1918)
- The Old Lady (1916)
- The Spell (1924)
- Cupboard Love (1931)
