= Cullaville =

Village in County Armagh, Northern Ireland

Coordinates: 54.062°N 6.6439°W

Cullaville: Irish: Baile Mhic Cullach
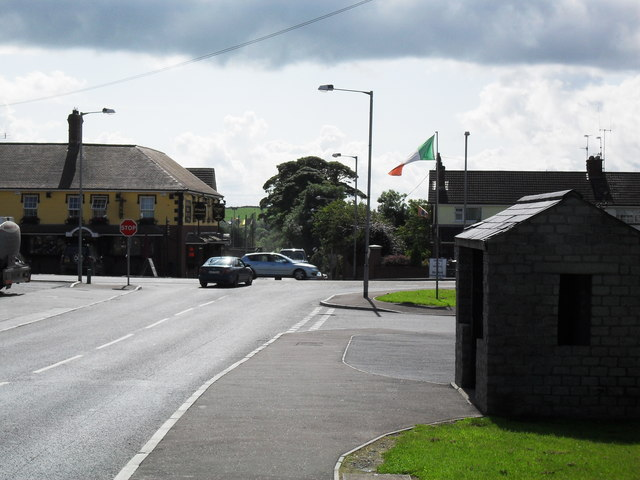

- Location within Northern Ireland
- Population: 400 (2001 Census)
- Irish grid reference: H910152
  - Belfast: 56 mi (90 km)
- District: Newry & Mourne
- County: County Armagh
- Country: Northern Ireland
- Sovereign state: United Kingdom
- Post town: NEWRY
- Postcode district: BT
- Dialling code: 028
- UK Parliament: Newry & Armagh
- NI Assembly: Newry & Armagh

Cullaville or Culloville (from Irish Baile Mhic Cullach, meaning 'MacCullach's townland' or McCulloch's ville or town is a small village and townland near Crossmaglen in County Armagh, Northern Ireland. It is the southernmost settlement in the county and one of the southernmost in Northern Ireland, straddling the Irish border. In the 2001 Census it had a population of 400 people. The village is on a busy crossroads on the main Dundalk to Castleblaney road (the A37 in Northern Ireland and N53 in the Republic); three of the roads lead across the border and the fourth leads to Crossmaglen.

== History ==
=== Events ===
On 29 March 1922, during the Irish War of Independence, Irish Republican Army (IRA) volunteers ambushed and shot dead two Royal Irish Constabulary men (Patrick Earley and James Harper) at Ballinacarry Bridge, Cullaville.

Cullaville, along with the rest of South Armagh, would have been transferred to the Irish Free State had the recommendations of the Irish Boundary Commission been enacted in 1925.

On 2 September 1942, (the day after the hanging of IRA man Tom Williams) and during the Northern Campaign of the IRA, an attack was scheduled to take place against a British Army barracks in Crossmaglen. Twenty IRA volunteers were led by Patrick Demody and Charlie Kerins in a commandeered lorry and accompanying car. A passing Royal Ulster Constabulary (RUC) patrol, however, noticed the IRA convoy as it moved through Cullaville and in the ensuing gun battle, one IRA man was injured along with one RUC member. Conflicting accounts exist of the outcome, one claiming that the IRA unit surrendered and was released, all survivors being allowed to return to Dublin; another claiming that it was the RUC men (there were only two of them) who surrendered to the IRA and were released.

== Sport ==
The village is home to Culloville Blues Gaelic Athletic Club. Tracing its origins to a club founded in 1888, it is one of the oldest clubs in Ireland.

== Transport ==
The former station, Culloville railway station and current post office are south of the River Fane, in County Monaghan. The station was located on the former Great Northern Railway's Irish North West line from Dundalk to Enniskillen, which opened in June 1858 but lost its passenger service in 1957, and closed completely in 1959. Only the station masters house, up platform and brick built signal cabin base remains at Culloville, the rest of the station buildings have since been demolished.

== See also ==
- Occupation of Cullaville

== Sources ==
- NI Neighbourhood Information System

== See also ==
- List of villages in Northern Ireland
- List of towns in Northern Ireland
