= Carrickmacross =

Town in County Monaghan, Ireland

Carrickmacross Carraig Mhachaire Rois
- Town
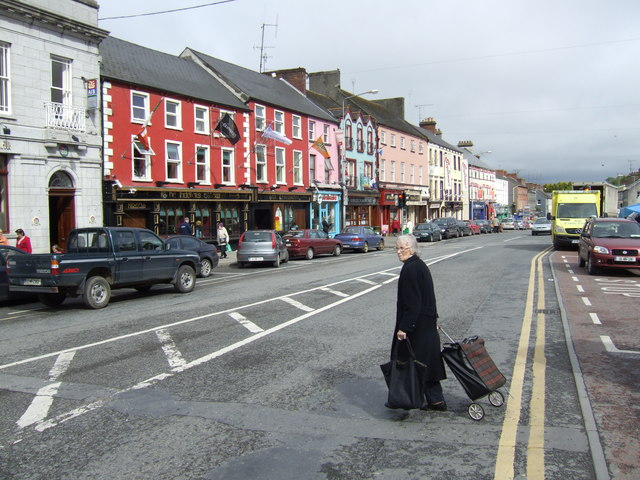
- Main Street in 2007

- Location in Ireland
- Coordinates: 53.976°N 6.719°W
- Country: Ireland
- Province: Ulster
- County: County Monaghan
- Elevation: 44 m (144 ft)

Population (2022)
  - Total: 5,745
- Eircode routing key: A81
- Telephone area code: +353(0)42
- Irish Grid Reference: H837039
- Website: www.carrickmacross.ie

Historical population
| Year | Pop. | ±% |
|---|---|---|
| 1821 | 1,641 | — |
| 1831 | 2,979 | +81.5% |
| 1841 | 1,997 | −33.0% |
| 1851 | 2,529 | +26.6% |
| 1861 | 2,063 | −18.4% |
| 1871 | 2,017 | −2.2% |
| 1881 | 2,002 | −0.7% |
| 1891 | 1,779 | −11.1% |
| 1901 | 1,874 | +5.3% |
| 1911 | 2,064 | +10.1% |
| 1926 | 1,995 | −3.3% |
| 1936 | 2,095 | +5.0% |
| 1946 | 2,116 | +1.0% |
| 1951 | 2,045 | −3.4% |
| 1956 | 2,155 | +5.4% |
| 1961 | 2,108 | −2.2% |
| 1966 | 2,094 | −0.7% |
| 1971 | 2,475 | +18.2% |
| 1981 | 3,292 | +33.0% |
| 1986 | 3,465 | +5.3% |
| 1991 | 3,341 | −3.6% |
| 1996 | 3,617 | +8.3% |
| 2002 | 3,832 | +5.9% |
| 2006 | 4,387 | +14.5% |
| 2011 | 4,925 | +12.3% |
| 2016 | 5,032 | +2.2% |
| 2022 | 5,745 | +14.2% |

Carrickmacross (Irish: Carraig Mhachaire Rois, meaning 'rock of the wooded plain') is a town in County Monaghan, Ireland. The population was 5,745 at the 2022 census, making it the second-largest town in the county. Carrickmacross is a market town which developed around a castle built by the Earl of Essex in 1630. The town is 20km west of Dundalk and 75km north-north-west of Dublin city centre and 106km south west of Belfast. Carrickmacross won the European Entente Florale Silver Medal Award in 1998.

== History ==
=== Foundation and development ===
Carrickmacross is a market town which developed around a castle built by the Earl of Essex in 1630. The Convent of St Louis now stands on the original castle site, as the castle itself was destroyed in the late 17th century during the Williamite Wars.

The town developed further as a market town during the 18th century, and a number of large municipal and religious buildings were built to serve the growing population during the 19th century. The town experienced population decline in mid- to late-19th century, during the Great Famine, with the population decreasing from 2,063 in 1861 to 1,779 inhabitants by 1891. The town's Poor Law Union Workhouse and Fever Hospital were built in this period - the latter later becoming the offices of the Urban District Council which was originally formed in 1899.

=== Built heritage ===
Among the historic buildings in the town is the Roman Catholic church which was completed in 1866 and is dedicated to Saint Joseph. It contains ten stained-glass windows which were designed by the artist Harry Clarke in 1925. The town's Church of Ireland church, dedicated to Saint Finbarr, is older, and was built c.1770 before being remodelled c.1845.

Magheross Church, located on the outskirts of the town, is also of historical interest, and originally dates from c.1550. Other notable buildings include the Carrickmacross Courthouse (built in 1837) and the restored Poor Law Union Workhouse (built in 1841).

The grave of Patrick Byrne (1794–1863), the last major exponent of the Gaelic harp and the first Irish traditional musician ever photographed, is in the area.

=== Lacemaking ===
The town is known for the lace bearing its name. Carrickmacross lace is worked in an individual style, devised by Mrs Grey Porter, wife of the rector of Donaghmoyne, who introduced it in 1820. When she left the district the teaching of Carrickmacross lacemaking was continued by Miss Reid of Rahans, but it was only after the Great Famine in 1846, when a lace school was set up by the managers of the Bath and Shirley estates at Carrickmacross as a means of helping their starving tenants, that the lace became known and found sales.

Subsequently, the lacemaking declined, but in the last decade of the 19th century the Sisters of St Louis founded their own lace school to revive the craft, and this was quite profitable for several years. Although the outbreak of the 1914–18 war marked the virtual end of commercial production of hand-made lace in Europe, the lace school kept the technique alive throughout most of the 20th century. In 1984 the St Louis Sisters assisted in the formation of the Carrickmacross Lace Co-operative, which maintains the tradition to this day.

=== Luftwaffe attack ===
Although Ireland was neutral during World War Two, there were some incidents during the period. On 20 December 1940, as well as two bombs falling on Sandycove in Dublin, two more fell on Shantonagh near Carrickmacross, causing minor damage to house property.

== Transport ==
Carrickmacross railway station opened on 31 July 1886, the terminus of a branch from the Dundalk–Enniskillen line at Inniskeen. The station, and the branch, closed to passengers on 10 March 1947, but remained open for goods traffic until final closure on 1 January 1960.

== Education ==
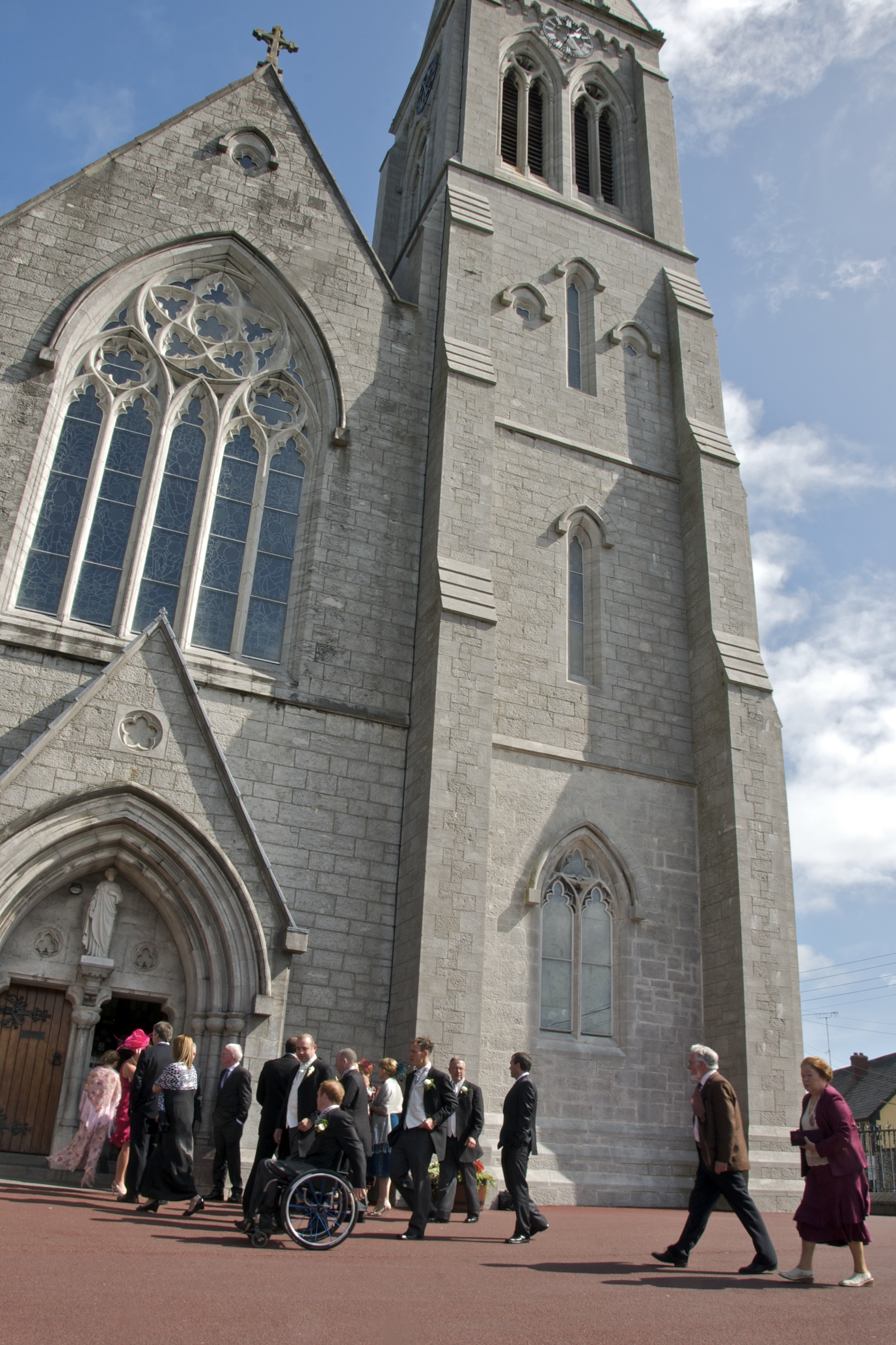
St. Joseph's RC Church, Carrickmacross

=== Primary schools ===
There are three primary schools in Carrickmacross:

- St. Joseph's Boys National School is an all-boys national school which was previously run by the Patrician Brothers.
- Bunscoil Lughaidh Naofa, an all-girls school in Cloughvalley, previously run by the St. Louis nuns who came to Carrickmacross in 1888.
- Scoil Rois is a Gaelscoil (Irish language-medium school)

=== Secondary schools ===
The Patrician High School (or PHS) is one of three secondary schools in Carrickmacross. It was set up by the Patrician Brothers and as of 2015 had approximately 500 pupils.

Inver College, formerly and colloquially known as "the tec" as being a technologically progressive school, is also a secondary school. As of August 2026, it had over 730 students enrolled.

St. Louis Convent is an all-girls secondary school set up by the St. Louis nuns in the 19th century. There were approximately 570 pupils enrolled in the school as of 2017. The school was set up in honour of St. Louis.

== Town twinning ==
Carrickmacross is twinned with the commune of Carhaix, Brittany, in France.

== Governance and politics ==
Carrickmacross town council elects 9 members and is responsible for the provision of local services. At the last local elections in 2009 three members were elected from Fine Gael and two each from Sinn Féin, Fianna Fáil and the Green Party. It forms part of the five-seat Carrickmacross Local Electoral Area for elections for Monaghan County Council.

In February 2010, the town council voted 5:4 to remove a page signed by the Israeli ambassador from the town's visitors' book in response to the illegal use of Irish passports by agents of Mossad in the assassination of Mahmoud al-Mabhouh.

== Sport ==
Carrickmacross Emmets is the local Gaelic Athletic Association (GAA) club. The local soccer team is Carrick Rovers. The town's basketball club, Carrick Cruisers, competes in competitions organised by Basketball Ireland.

== People ==
- Barry Conlon, footballer
- Noel Curran, RTÉ Director General, who was born in the town.
- Bernard Duffy, Irish barrister, novelist and playwright.
- Francis Noel Duffy, Green Party politician
- Thomas Hughes, Victoria Cross winner
- Eileen Kennedy, Ireland's first female judge
- Thomas McMahon, convicted murderer of four including Admiral of the Fleet The 1st Earl Mountbatten of Burma, two children and an elderly woman
- Gerry Murphy, RTÉ weatherman
- Ardal O'Hanlon, comedian and actor
- Rory O'Hanlon, former Ceann Comhairle
- Henry O'Reilly, Irish-American businessman and telegraphy pioneer
- Sephira, classical crossover group
- The Flaws, indie rock band

== See also ==
- List of towns and villages in Ireland
