= Second Jungbu Expressway =

Road in South Korea

Expressway No.37
- Second Jungbu Expressway
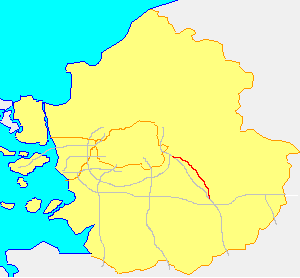

Route information
- Length: 31.08 km (19.31 mi)

Major junctions
- South end: Majang JC in Icheon, Gyeonggi-do; Jungbu Expressway
- 2
- North end: Sangok JC in Hanam, Gyeonggi-do; Jungbu Expressway

Location
- Country: South Korea

Highway system
- Highway systems of South Korea; Expressways; National; Local

- Second Jungbu Expressway
- Hangul: 제2중부고속도로
- Hanja: 第二中部高速道路
- RR: Je2 jungbu gosok doro
- MR: Che2 chungbu kosok toro

The Second Jungbu Expressway (Korean: 제2중부고속도로) is an expressway in South Korea, connecting Icheon to Hanam. Numbered 37, it runs parallel to and directly alongside the Jungbu Expressway (35) between Majang (마장) and Sangok (산곡), though it does not have any exits or junctions along its length. It is possible to transfer between the two expressways (35 and 37) at Icheon Services (rest area).

== Compositions ==
=== Lanes ===
- All segments of 2nd Jungbu Expressway : 4

=== Length ===
- 31.08 km

=== Limited Speed ===
- 110 km/h & Low 60 km/h

== List of facilities ==
- IC: Interchange, JC: Junction, SA: Service Area, TG:Tollgate

No.	Name	Korean name	Distance		Connection	Location		Note
Directly connected with Jungbu Expressway
37	Majang JC	마장 분기점	-	0.00	Jungbu Expressway	Gyeonggi Province	Icheon	
SA	Majang Premium SA	마장프리미엄휴게소				Gyeonggi Province	Icheon	
SA 38-1	Icheon Ssal SA; Sindun	이천휴게소	6.31	6.31		Gyeonggi Province	Icheon	Hanam-bound only
39-1	Gyeonggi-Gwangju JC	경기광주 분기점			Gwangju–Wonju Expressway	Gyeonggi Province	Gwangju	
41	Sangok JC	산곡 분기점	31.08	31.08	Jungbu Expressway	Gyeonggi Province	Hanam	
Directly connected with Jungbu Expressway

== See also ==
- Roads and expressways in South Korea
- Transportation in South Korea
