= Yeongdong Expressway =

Road

Expressway No.50
- Yeongdong Expressway

Route information
- Length: 234 km (145 mi)
- Existed: 1971–present

Major junctions
- From: Seochang Junction in Namdong-gu, Incheon; Second Gyeongin Expressway
- To: Gangneung Junction in Gangneung, Gangwon Province; Donghae Expressway

Location
- Country: South Korea
- Major cities: Ansan, Gunpo, Uiwang, Suwon, Yongin, Icheon, Wonju

Highway system
- Highway systems of South Korea; Expressways; National; Local

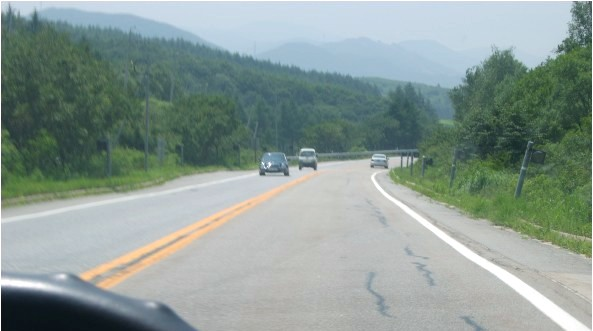
Yeongdong Expressway

- Yeongdong Expressway
- Hangul: 영동고속도로
- Hanja: 嶺東高速道路
- RR: Yeongdong gosok doro
- MR: Yŏngdong kosok toro

The Yeongdong Expressway (Korean: 영동고속도로) is an expressway in South Korea. Numbered 50, it connects the Seoul area with Gangwon Province. The name is derived from Yeongdong, a historic region that includes the present-day Gangwon Province. The road has its western end in Namdong-gu of Incheon Metropolitan City. Its eastern end lies in Gangneung near the east coast. From Incheon to Gangneung, the expressway covers 234.39 kilometers.

== History ==
- 24 March 1971 : Singal~Saemal (Yongin~Wonju) segment's construction begin. (Length 104 km)
- 1 December 1971 : Singal~Saemal segment opens to traffic. (2 lanes)
- 31 December 1973 : Yangji IC (Yongin) opens to traffic.
- 26 March 1974 : Saemal~Gangneung segment (Length 97 km) begins construction.
- 14 October 1975 : Saemal~Gangneung segment opens to traffic. (2 lanes)
- 10 April 1976 : Maseong IC opens to traffic.
- 5 January 1977 : Deokpyeong IC opens to traffic.
- 15 December 1988 : Connected of Donghae Expressway.
- 12 April 1989 : Ansan~Singal Segment (Length 23.2 km) begins construction. (4 lanes)
- 27 February 1991 : Seochang~Ansan Segment (Length 27.6 km) begins construction. (6 lanes)
- 29 November 1991 : Ansan~Singal segment opens to traffic.
- 6 November 1991 : Work begins to widen to 4 lanes in Singal~Wonju segment.
- 6 July 1994 : Seochang~Ansan segment opens to traffic.
- 12 December 1994 : Singal~Wonju widen to 4 lanes.
- 24 November 1995 : Work begins to widen to 4 lanes in Wonju~Woljeong TG.
- 30 July 1996 : Work begins to widen to 4 lanes in Woljeong TG~Hoenggye.
- 27 December 1996 : Work begins to widen to 4 lanes in Hoenggye~Gangneung.
- January 1997 : Work begins to widen to 6 lanes in Ansan~Singal.
- 20 December 1997 : Wonju~Saemal widen to 4 lanes.
- 15 July 1999 : Saemal~Woljeong TG widen to 4 lanes.
- 22 July 2000 : Woljeong TG~Hoenggye widen to 4 lanes.
- 2 May 2001 : Ansan~Singal widen to 4 lanes.
- 28 November 2001 : Hoenggye~Gangneung widen to 4 lanes.
- 31 October 2007 : Work begins to widen to 8 lanes in Singal~Hobeop.
- 29 December 2010 : Singal~Yangji widen to 6 lanes.
- 14 December 2011 : Yangji~Hobeop widen to 8 lanes.
- 28 March 2013 : Seochang~Gunja widen to 10 lanes.
- 3 September 2014 : Ladies' Code suffers a tragic car accident that leads to the deaths of members EunB and RiSe.

== Gallery ==
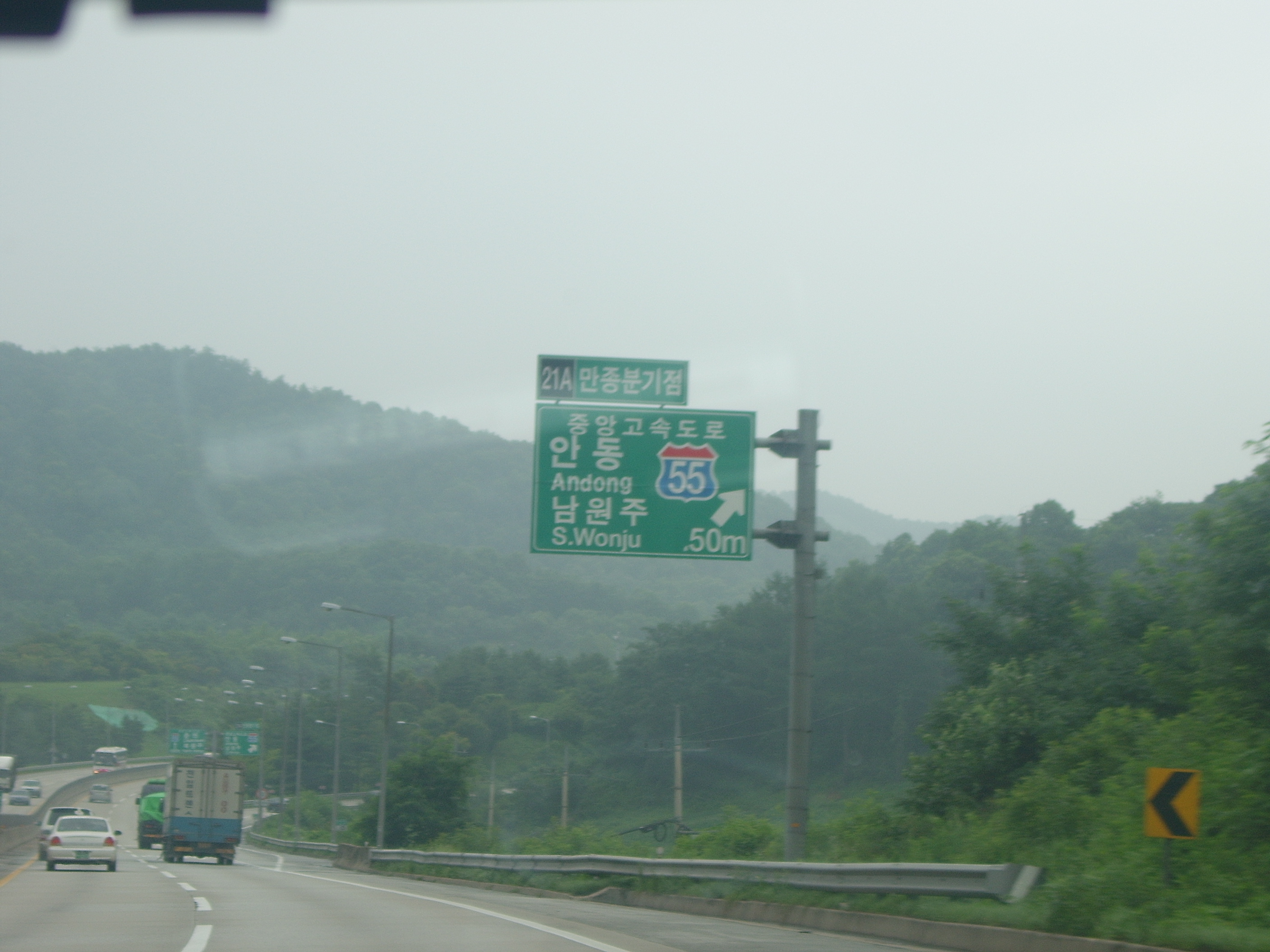
Manjong JC (2007) (Junction to Jungang Expressway)

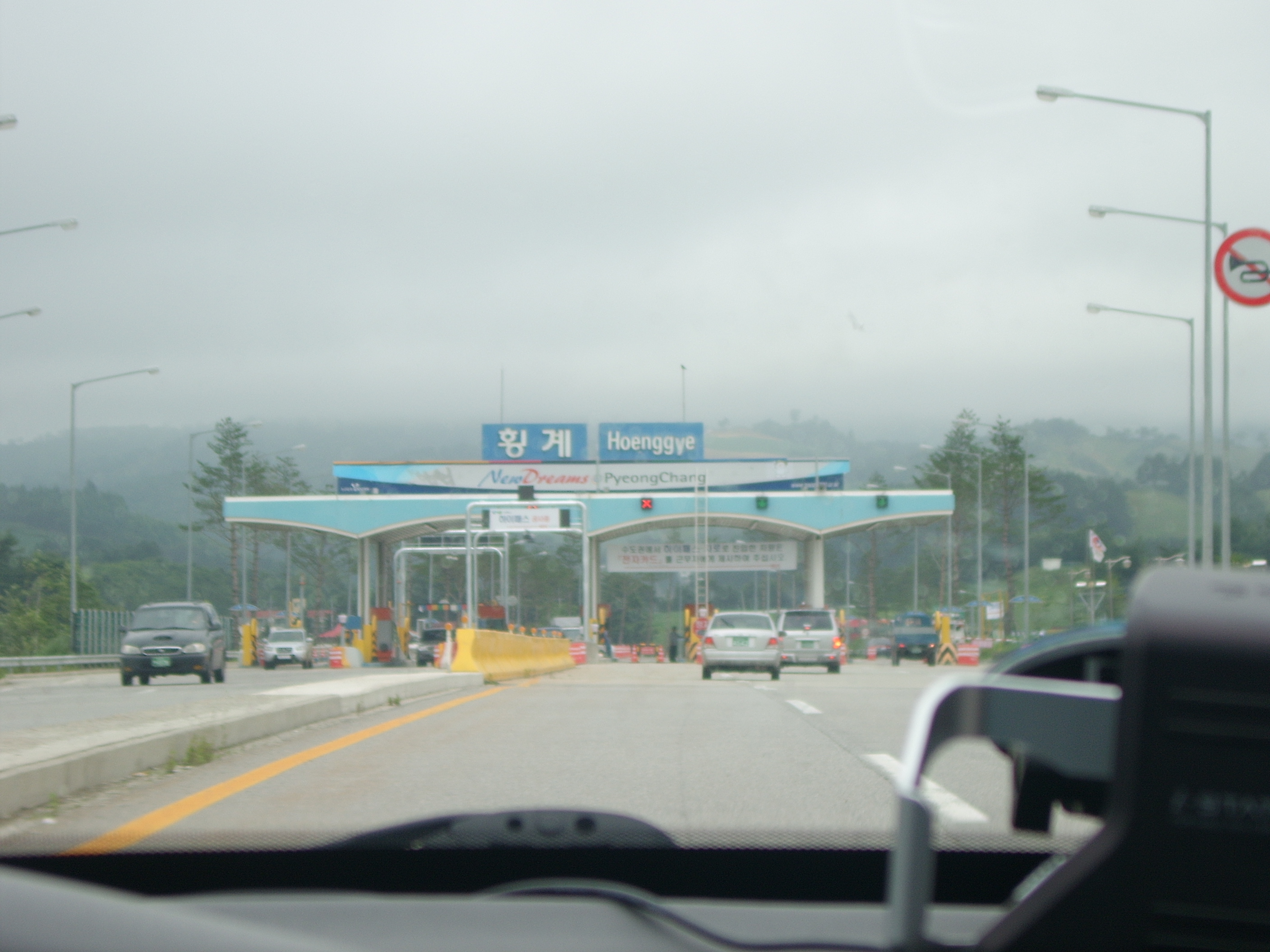
Hoenggye IC (2007)

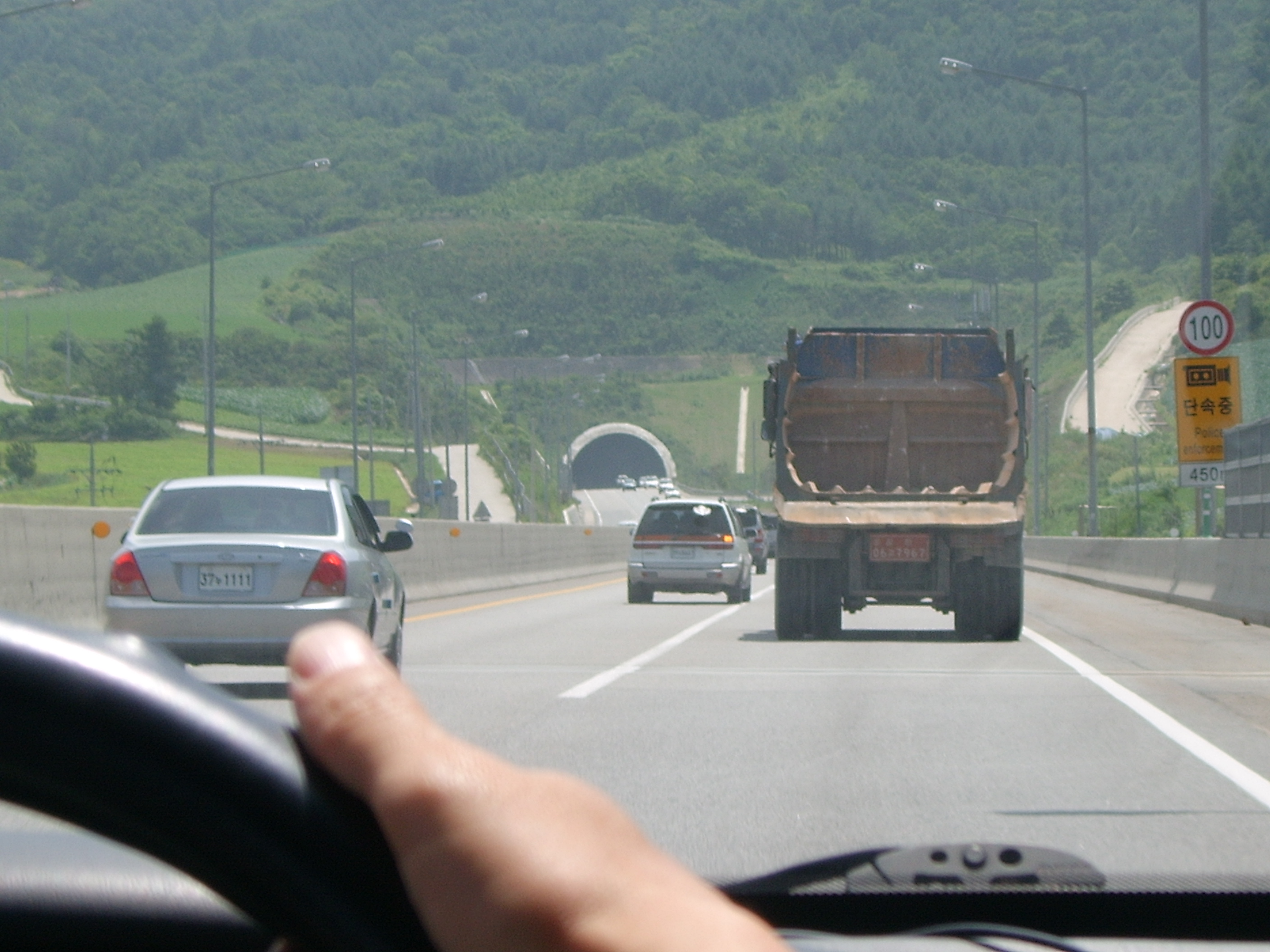
Daegwallyeong 1st Tunnel (2007)

== Compositions ==
=== Lanes ===
- Yeoju IC ~ Gangneung JC : 4
- Seochang JC ~ Wolgot JC, Gunja JC ~ Ansan IC, Ansan JC ~ N.Suwon IC, Yeoju JC ~ Yeoju IC : 6
- Ansan IC ~ Ansan JC, N.Suwon IC ~ Singal JC, Yongin IC ~ Yeoju JC : 8
- Wolgot JC ~ Gunja JC, Singal JC ~ Yongin IC : 10

=== Length ===
- 234.4 km

=== Limited Speed ===
- 100 km/h

== List of facilities ==
- IC: Interchange, JC: Junction, SA: Service Area, TG:Tollgate

No.	Name	Korean name	Hanja name	Connections	Notes	Location
Connected directly with Seoul Ring Expressway through Munemi-ro(무네미로)
	Incheon	인천 시점	仁川 始點	National Route 39	Expressway Begin Spot	Namdong-gu, Incheon
1	Seochang JC	서창분기점	西昌分岐點	2nd Gyeongin Expressway		Namdong-gu, Incheon
2	Wolgot JC	월곶분기점	月串分岐點	Provincial Route 330 (3rd Gyeongin Highway)		Siheung, Gyeonggi-do
3	Gunja JC	군자분기점	君子分岐點	Pyeongtaek-Siheung Expressway	Incheon-bound Only	Siheung, Gyeonggi-do
TG	Gunja TG	군자요금소	君子料金所		Main Tollgate	Siheung, Gyeonggi-do
4	W. Ansan IC	서안산나들목	西安山나들목	National Route 39		Ansan, Gyeonggi-do
SA	Ansan SA	안산휴게소	安山休憩所			Ansan, Gyeonggi-do
5	Ansan IC	안산나들목	安山나들목	National Route 42 (Suin-ro)		Ansan, Gyeonggi-do
6	Ansan JC	안산분기점	安山分岐點	Seohaean Expressway		Ansan, Gyeonggi-do
7	Dundae JC	둔대분기점	屯垈分岐點	Seohaean Expressway	Gangneung-bound Only; Mokpo-bound Only	Gunpo, Gyeonggi-do
8	Gunpo IC	군포나들목	軍浦나들목	National Route 47		Gunpo, Gyeonggi-do
9	E. Gunpo IC	동군포나들목	東軍浦나들목	Pyeongtaek–Paju Expressway (Indirect Connect) National Route 47		Gunpo, Gyeonggi-do
10	Bugok IC	부곡나들목	富谷나들목	National Route 1 Provincial Route 309		Uiwang, Gyeonggi-do
11	N. Suwon IC	북수원나들목	北水原나들목	National Route 1		Suwon, Gyeonggi-do
12	E. Suwon IC	동수원나들목	東水原나들목	National Route 43; Yongin-Seoul Expressway (Indirect Connect)		Suwon, Gyeonggi-do
13	Singal JC	신갈분기점	新葛分岐點	Gyeongbu Expressway( AH 1)		Yongin, Gyeonggi-do
14	Maseong IC	마성나들목	麻城나들목	Provincial Route 321		Yongin, Gyeonggi-do
15	W. Yongin JC	서용인분기점	西龍仁分岐點	Capital Region 2nd Ring Expressway		Yongin, Gyeonggi-do
17	Yongin IC	용인나들목	龍仁나들목	National Route 45		Yongin, Gyeonggi-do
SA	Yongin SA	용인휴게소	龍仁休憩所			Yongin, Gyeonggi-do
18	Yongin JC	용인분기점	龍仁分岐點	Sejong-Pocheon Expressway		Yongin, Gyeonggi-do
19	Yangji IC	양지나들목	陽智나들목	National Route 17; National Route 42	Begin point of Nat'l Route 17	Yongin, Gyeonggi-do
20	Deokpyeong IC	덕평나들목	德坪나들목	Provincial Route 325		Icheon, Gyeonggi-do
SA	Deokpyeong Jayeon SA	덕평자연휴게소	德坪自然休憩所			Icheon, Gyeonggi-do
21	Hobeop JC	호법분기점	戶法分岐點	Jungbu Expressway		Icheon, Gyeonggi-do
22	Icheon IC	이천나들목	利川나들목	National Route 3		Icheon, Gyeonggi-do
SA	Yeoju SA	여주휴게소	驪州休憩所			Yeoju, Gyeonggi-do
23	Yeoju JC	여주분기점	驪州分岐點	Jungbu Naeryuk Expressway		Yeoju, Gyeonggi-do
24	Yeoju IC	여주나들목	驪州나들목	National Route 37		Yeoju, Gyeonggi-do
SA	Munmak SA	문막휴게소	文幕休憩所		Incheon-bound Only	Wonju, Gangwon-do
25	Munmak IC	문막나들목	文幕나들목	National Route 42		Wonju, Gangwon-do
SA	Munmak SA	문막휴게소	文幕休憩所		Gangneung-bound Only	Wonju, Gangwon-do
26	Manjong JC	만종분기점	萬鍾分岐點	Jungang Expressway		Wonju, Gangwon-do
27	Wonju JC	원주분기점	原州分岐點	Gwangju-Wonju Expressway		Wonju, Gangwon-do
28	Wonju IC	원주나들목	原州나들목	National Route 5		Wonju, Gangwon-do
29	Saemal IC (East Hoengseong)	새말나들목 (동횡성)	새말나들목 (東橫城)	National Route 42		Hoengseong, Gangwon-do
SA	Hoengseong SA	횡성휴게소	橫城休憩所			Hoengseong, Gangwon-do
30	Dunnae IC	둔내나들목	屯內나들목	National Route 6		Hoengseong, Gangwon-do
30-1	E. Dunnae IC	동둔내나들목	東屯內나들목	Cheongtaesan-ro		Hoengseong, Gangwon-do
31	Myeonon IC	면온나들목	綿溫나들목	Provincial Route 408		Pyeongchang, Gwangwon-do
32	Pyeongchang IC	평창나들목	平昌나들목	National Route 6	Former name is Jangpyeong IC(장평IC)	Pyeongchang, Gwangwon-do
SA	Pyeongchang SA	평창휴게소	平昌休憩所			Pyeongchang, Gwangwon-do
33	Soksa IC	속사나들목	束沙나들목	National Route 6 National Route 31		Pyeongchang, Gwangwon-do
35	Jinbu IC	진부나들목	珍富나들목	National Route 6 National Route 59		Pyeongchang, Gwangwon-do
36	Daegwallyeong IC	대관령나들목	大關嶺나들목	Provincial Route 456	Former name is Hoenggye IC(횡계IC)	Pyeongchang, Gwangwon-do
SA	Gangneung SA	강릉휴게소	江陵休憩所			Gangneung, Gangwon-do
37	Gangneung JC	강릉분기점	江陵分岐點	Donghae Expressway( AH 6)		Gangneung, Gangwon-do

== See also ==
- Roads and expressways in South Korea
- Transportation in South Korea
