= List of highways numbered 37A =

The following highways are numbered 37A:

== Canada ==
- British Columbia Highway 37A

== India ==
- National Highway 37A (India)

== United States ==
- Indiana State Road 37A (former)
- Nebraska Highway 37A (former)
  - Nebraska Recreation Road 37A
- New York State Route 37A (former)
  - County Route 37A (Cayuga County, New York)
- South Dakota Highway 37A
