= Virginia State Route 37 (disambiguation) =

Virginia State Route 37 (SR 37) currently bypasses Winchester to the west. There have been four previous routes with the same number:

- Virginia State Route 37 (1923-1933), renumbered SR 3 in 1933
- Virginia State Route 37 (1933), southeast of Richmond, swapped with SR 10 in the mid-1930s
- Virginia State Route 37 (pre-1940), southeast of Richmond, renumbered SR 106 in 1940
- Virginia State Route 37 (1940), southwest of Suffolk, numbered to match North Carolina; became part of US 13 in the early 1950s
