= Blackstaff Halt railway station =

Railway station in Ireland

Blackstaff Halt

General information
- Location: County Monaghan; Ireland

History
- Original company: Great Northern Railway
- Post-grouping: Great Northern Railway

Key dates
- 15 August 1927: Station opens
- 14 October 1957: Station closes

Blackstaff Halt railway station was on the Great Northern Railway in the Republic of Ireland.

The Great Northern Railway opened the station on 15 August 1927.

It closed on 14 October 1957.

== Routes ==
Preceding station	Disused railways	Following station
Inniskeen	Great Northern Railway (Ireland); Dundalk to Enniskillen	Culloville
