= Gwangju–Wonju Expressway =

Expressway in South Korea

Expressway No.52
- Gwangju-Wonju Expressway (2nd Yeongdong Expressway) 광주원주고속도로

Route information
- Length: 59.65 km (37.06 mi)
- Existed: 2016–present

Major junctions
- East end: Gwangju, Gyeonggi Province
- West end: Wonju, Gangwon Province

Location
- Country: South Korea
- Major cities: Gwangju, Yeoju, Yangpyeong County, Wonju

Highway system
- Highway systems of South Korea; Expressways; National; Local

Gwangju–Wonju Expressway (2nd Yeongdong Expressway) (Korean: 광주원주고속도로; Gwangju-Wonju Gosokdoro) is an expressway connecting Gwangju to Yeoju, Yangpyeong County and Wonju. The expressway route number is 52.

== Compositions ==
=== Speed limit ===
- 100 km/h

=== Lanes ===
- 4

=== Length ===
- 59.65 km

== List of facilities ==
- IC: Interchange, JC: Junction, SA: Service Area

No.	Name	Korean Name	Distance	Connections	Location		Notes
1	Gyeonggi-Gwangju JC	경기광주 분기점	0.00	Jungbu Expressway; 2nd Jungbu Expressway	Gyeonggi Province	Gwangju	
2	E.Gonjiam IC	동곤지암	8.30	Provincial Route 98 (Gwangyeo-ro)	Gyeonggi Province	Gwangju	
SA	Gyeonggi-Gwangju SA	경기광주휴게소			Gyeonggi Province	Gwangju	Both directions
3	Heungcheon-Ipo IC	흥천이포	18.50	Provincial Route 70 (Jungbu Naeryuk Expressway)	Gyeonggi Province	Yeoju	
4	Daesin IC	대신	24.38	National Route 37; Provincial Route 88 (Yeoyang-ro)	Gyeonggi Province	Yeoju	
5	E.Yeoju IC	동여주	33.04	Provincial Route 88 (Goldasa-ro)	Gyeonggi Province	Yeoju	
SA	Yangpyeong SA	양평휴게소			Gyeonggi Province	Yangpyeong County	Both directions
6	E.Yangpyeong IC	동양평	40.16	Provincial Route 349 (Wonyang 1-ro)	Gyeonggi Province	Yangpyeong County	
7	W.Wonju IC	서원주	49.97	Wolsongseokhwa-ro	Gangwon Province	Wonju	
8	Sinpyeong JC	신평 분기점	53.22	Jungang Expressway	Gangwon Province	Wonju	
9	Wonju JC	원주 분기점	56.95	Yeongdong Expressway	Gangwon Province	Wonju	
Connection with Yeongdong Expressway

== See also ==
- Roads and expressways in South Korea
- Transportation in South Korea
