= Carrickmacross railway station =

Former railway station in Ireland

Coordinates: 53.9757°N 6.7116°W

Carrickmacross

General information
- Location: Carrickmacross, County Monaghan; Ireland

History
- Original company: Great Northern Railway (Ireland)
- Post-grouping: Great Northern Railway (Ireland)

Key dates
- 31 July 1886: Station opens
- 10 March 1947: Station closes to passengers
- 1 January 1960: Station closes completely
Location

Carrickmacross railway station was on the Great Northern Railway (Ireland) in the Republic of Ireland.

== History ==
The Great Northern Railway (Ireland) opened the station on 31 July 1886. The branch closed to passengers on 10 March 1947, though it remained in use for light goods until 1 January 1960.

The station building and platform have since been demolished, but the engine house, station house, water tower and a number of sheds remain. The former stationmasters house is also fully intact now used as a domestic residence.

== Routes ==
Preceding station	Disused railways	Following station
Essexford	Great Northern Railway (Ireland); Inniskeen to Carrickmacross	Terminus
