= A37 road (Northern Ireland) =

Road in Northern Ireland

Coordinates: 54.05997°N 6.63952°W

The name A37 is used to refer to two roads in Northern Ireland.

In the north, there is a road from Coleraine to Limavady, part of the Coleraine to Derry route, about 11.2 miles (18.0 km) long.

In the south, there is a short road in County Armagh known as Concession Road. It connects two sections of the N53, a route in the Republic, which connects the towns of Castleblaney and Dundalk. The road is about 6 kilometres (3.7 mi) long, and goes through the village of Cullaville.
