= Jungbu Expressway =

Expressway in South Korea

Jungbu Expressway
- Expressway No.35 중부고속도로

Route information
- Length: 117.23 km (72.84 mi)
- Existed: 1987–present

Major junctions
- South end: Cheongju, Chungbuk Province (Nami JC); Gyeongbu Expressway ( AH 1)
- Pyeongtaek–Jecheon Expressway; Yeongdong Expressway; Second Jungbu Expressway; Gwangju-Wonju Expressway
- North end: Hanam, Gyeonggi Province (Hanam JC); Seoul Ring Expressway

Location
- Country: South Korea

Highway system
- Highway systems of South Korea; Expressways; National; Local

- Jungbu Expressway
- Hangul: 중부고속도로
- Hanja: 中部高速道路
- RR: Jungbu gosok doro
- MR: Chungbu kosok toro

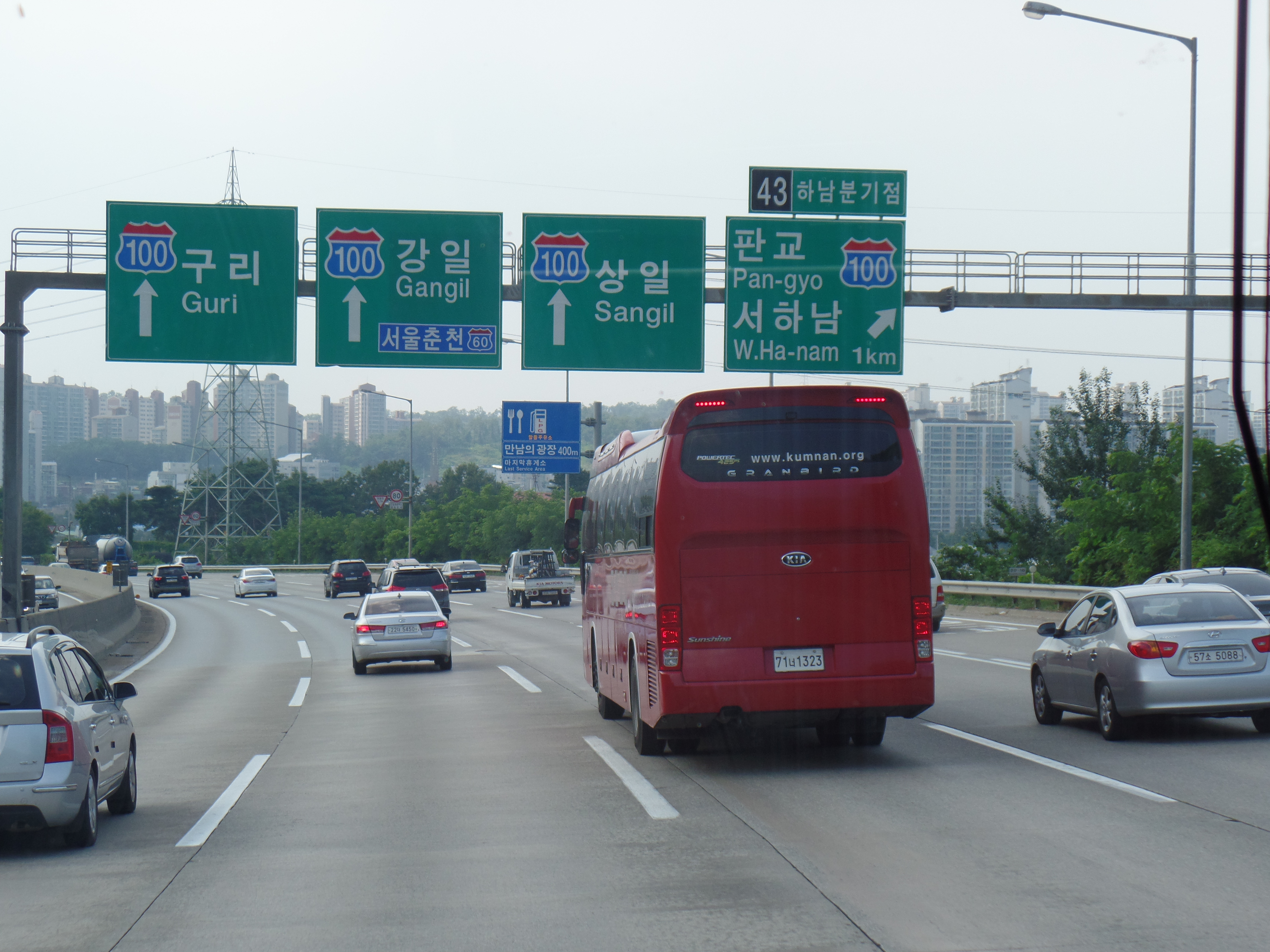
Hanam JC.

The Jungbu Expressway (Korean: 중부고속도로) is an expressway in South Korea. Numbered 35, it connects Cheongju to Hanam. The expressway's route number is 35, which it shares with the Tongyeong–Daejeon Expressway. This expressway joins the Gyeongbu Expressway at Cheongju and they divide again at Daejeon.

== History ==
- April 1985 – Construction begins.
- December 1987 – Numbered 10, Gangil (East Seoul)-Nami segment opens to traffic.
- November 1991 – Gangil-Hanam segment transfers to Seoul Ring Expressway.
- August 2001 – Numbered 35, which it shares with the Tongyeong–Daejeon Expressway.
- November 2001 – New Majang-Sangok segment opens as Second Jungbu Expressway.

== List of facilities ==
- IC: Interchange, JC: Junction, SA: Service area, TG: Tollgate

No.	Name	Korean name	Hanja name	Connections	Distance		Notes	Location	
Tongyeong ~ Biryong (Daejeon) segment's name is Tongyeong–Daejeon Expressway
28	Nami JC	남이분기점	南二分岐點	Gyeongbu Expressway ( AH 1)	—	247.36 (0.00)	Seoul-bound only	Cheongju	Chungbuk
28-1	Cheongju Gangseo IC			Gangseo-ro; Seohyeon-ro	—		Hi-pass only	Cheongju	Chungbuk
29	W. Cheongju IC	서청주나들목	西淸州나들목	Local Route 507; Local Route 693	6.02	253.38 (6.02)		Cheongju	Chungbuk
30	Ochang IC	오창나들목	梧倉나들목	National Route 17; Local Route 96; Local Route 508; Local Route 540	7.46	260.84 (13.48)		Cheongju	Chungbuk
30-1	Ochang JC			Dangjin-Cheongju Expressway				Cheongju	Chungbuk
SA	Ochang SA	오창휴게소	梧倉休憩所					Cheongju	Chungbuk
31	Jeungpyeong IC	증평나들목	曾坪나들목	Local Route 510; Local Route 511	8.37	269.21 (21.85)		Cheongju	Chungbuk
32	Jincheon IC	진천나들목	鎭川나들목	National Route 21	11.99	281.20 (33.84)		Jincheon	Chungbuk
33	Daeso JC	대소분기점	大所分岐點	Pyeongtaek–Jecheon Expressway	8.50	289.70 (42.34)		Eumseong	Chungbuk
34	Daeso IC	대소나들목	大所나들목	Local Route 82	4.19	293.89 (46.53)		Eumseong	Chungbuk
SA 34-1	Eumseong SA; Samseong IC	삼성나들목 음성휴게소	三成나들목 陰城休憩所	Local Route 329	4.66	298.55 (51.19)	Hi-pass only	Eumseong	Chungbuk
35	Iljuk IC	일죽나들목	一竹나들목	National Route 38; Local Route 306	8.25	306.80 (59.44)		Anseong	Gyeonggi
35-1	S. Icheon IC	남이천나들목	南利川나들목	Local Route 70; Local Route 84	10.71	317.51 (70.15)		Anseong	Gyeonggi
36	Hobeop JC	호법분기점	戶法分岐點	Yeongdong Expressway	6.00	323.51 (76.15)		Icheon	Gyeonggi
37	Majang JC	마장분기점	麻長分岐點	Second Jungbu Expressway	2.38	325.89 (78.53)	Seoul-bound exit only Tongyeong-bound enter only	Icheon	Gyeonggi
SA	Majang SA	마장휴게소	麻長休憩所				Seoul-bound only	Icheon	Gyeonggi
SA	Icheon SA	이천휴게소	利川休憩所				Tongyeong-bound only	Icheon	Gyeonggi
38	W. Icheon IC	서이천나들목	西利川나들목	National Route 3 National Route 42	3.31	329.20 (81.84)		Icheon	Gyeonggi
SA 38-1	Icheon Rice SA; Sindun	이천휴게소	利川休憩所	Seoicheon-ro 853-gil Dojayesul-ro 62-gi			Hi-pass only; Seoul-bound only	Icheon	Gyeonggi
38-2	Gonjiam JC			Capital Region Second Ring Expressway				Gwangju	Gyeonggi
39	Gonjiam IC	곤지암나들목	昆池岩나들목	National Route 3	7.71	339.91 (92.55)		Gwangju	Gyeonggi
39-1	Gyeonggi Gwangju JC	경기광주분기점	京畿廣州分岐點	Gwangju-Wonju Expressway; Second Gyeongin Expressway	—	—	Seoul-bound enter only Tongyeong-bound exit only	Gwangju	Gyeonggi
40	Gwangju IC	광주나들목	廣州나들목	National Route 43; National Route 45; Local Route 342	12.12	352.03 (104.67)		Gwangju	Gyeonggi
41	Sangok JC	산곡분기점	山谷分岐點	Second Jungbu Expressway	4.94	356.97 (109.61)	Seoul-bound enter only Tongyeong-bound exit only	Hanam	Gyeonggi
TG	E. Seoul TG	동서울요금소	東서울料金所					Hanam	Gyeonggi
42	Hanam IC	하남나들목	河南나들목	National Route 6 National Route 43; National Route 45	5.19	362.16 (114.80)		Hanam	Gyeonggi
SA	Hanam Dream SA	하남드림휴게소	河南드림休憩所					Hanam	Gyeonggi
43	Hanam JC (East Seoul)	하남분기점 (동서울)	河南分岐點	Seoul Ring Expressway ( Seoul-Yangyang Expressway)	2.43	364.59 (117.23)	Expressway end	Hanam	Gyeonggi
Connected directly with Seoul Ring Expressway

== See also ==
- Tongyeong–Daejeon Expressway
- Second Jungbu Expressway
- Expressways in South Korea
- Transport in South Korea
