= Sir John Leslie, 2nd Baronet =

Anglo-Irish soldier (1857–1944)

Colonel Sir John Leslie Bt CBE JP DL

Lord Lieutenant of Monaghan
- In office 1921–1922
- Preceded by: The Lord Rossmore

High Sheriff of Monaghan
- In office 1905–1905
- Preceded by: Anketell Moutray
- Succeeded by: John Clements Waterhouse Madden

Personal details
- Born: 7 August 1857 Kensington, London, England
- Died: 25 January 1944 (aged 86) Glaslough, County Monaghan, Ireland
- Spouse: Leonie Blanche Jerome (m. 1884; died 1943)
- Relations: George Dawson-Damer (grandfather); Charles Powell Leslie (uncle)
- Children: 5, including Shane
- Parent(s): Sir John Leslie, 1st Baronet; Lady Constance Dawson-Damer
- Education: Eton College

Military service
- Allegiance: United Kingdom
- Branch/service: British Army
- Rank: Colonel
- Unit: Royal Inniskilling Fusiliers; Royal Irish Fusiliers
- Battles/wars: Anglo-Egyptian War; Second Boer War; World War I

Colonel Sir John Leslie, 2nd Baronet, CBE, JP, DL (7 August 1857 – 25 January 1944) was a British Army officer and landowner.

== Early life ==
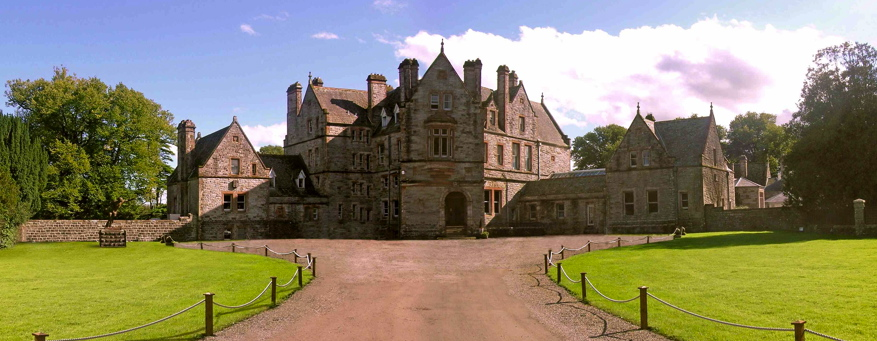
Castle Leslie

Leslie was born in London on 7 August 1857. He was the only son of Sir John Leslie, 1st Baronet, and Lady Constance Wilhelmina Frances Dawson-Damer, sister of the 4th Earl of Portarlington. His father was the Conservative Member of Parliament for County Monaghan from 1871 to 1880 and was created a baronet in 1876. After his father's death in January 1916, Leslie succeeded his father as the 2nd Baronet Leslie, of Glaslough. He was educated at Eton.

== Career ==
Leslie was commissioned into the Grenadier Guards, with whom he served as a lieutenant at the Battle of Tel el Kebir in 1882, distinguishing himself under fire. After fighting in South Africa during the Second Boer War in 1900, he was appointed lieutenant-colonel of the 5th Battalion, Royal Irish Fusiliers in April 1902, and later became honorary colonel of the battalion. In 1915, he was appointed lieutenant-colonel of the 12th Reserve Battalion, Royal Inniskilling Fusiliers.

He served as High Sheriff of Monaghan in 1905 and was also a Justice of the Peace and Deputy Lieutenant for the county. The Leslies were strongly opposed to the Home Rule movement. Leslie led the Monaghan Militia in the 1890s and he allowed the Ulster Volunteers to drill at his demesne in 1914.

== Personal life ==
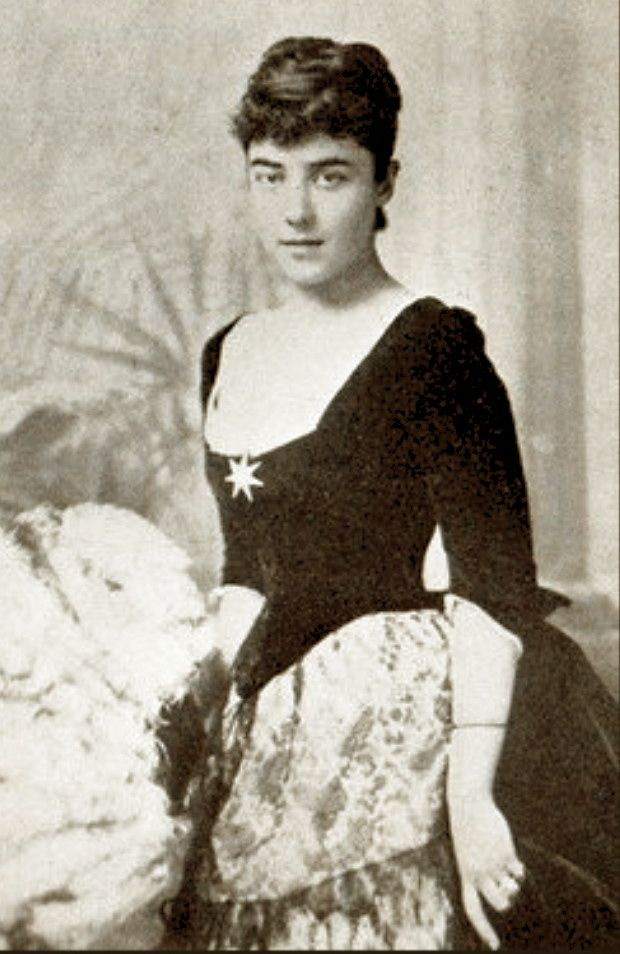
Leonie Jerome

On 2 October 1884 in New York City, with disapproval from both families, Leslie married Leonie Blanche Jerome (1859–1943), daughter of the wealthy American financier Leonard Jerome. Leonie's sister was Jennie, wife of Lord Randolph Churchill and mother of Winston Churchill. Leslie and his wife had four children:

- Sir John Randolph Leslie, 3rd Baronet (1885–1971), who married Marjorie Ide, daughter of Henry Clay Ide, the American Governor-General of the Philippines.
- Captain Norman Jerome Beauchamp Leslie (1886–1914), who was killed in action in Armentières, France, during World War I.
- Seymour William Leslie (1889–1979), who married Gwyneth Rawdon Roden (1903–1999) in 1929.
- Lionel Alistair David Leslie (1900–1987), who married Barbara Yvonne Enever in 1942.

The Leslie family were one of the largest landowning families in Ulster. Their holdings comprised 70,000 acres (280 km^{2}) in counties Monaghan, Fermanagh, Tyrone and Donegal. In his second autobiographical book, Lionel recounted various anecdotes about his immediate family and their home at Castle Leslie in County Monaghan.

Sir John Leslie died in Glaslough, County Monaghan in Ireland on 25 January 1944.

=== Descendants ===
Through his eldest son, he was the grandfather of Anita Leslie (1914–1985), a novelist who married Commander Bill King; Sir John Leslie, 4th Baronet (1916–2016), popularly known as Sir Jack Leslie, who never married; and Desmond Arthur Leslie (1921–2001), a pilot and film maker.

Baronetage of the United Kingdom
| Preceded by John Leslie | Baronet (of Glaslough); 1916–1944 | Succeeded by John Randolph Leslie |
