= Leslie baronets of Glaslough (1876) =

Escutcheon of the Leslie baronets of Glaslough

The Leslie baronetcy, of Glaslough in the County of Monaghan, was created in the Baronetage of the United Kingdom on 21 February 1876 for John Leslie, Member of Parliament for County Monaghan, son of Charles Powell Leslie (1769–1831). He was a descendant of John Leslie, Bishop of Clogher, son of George Leslie of Crichie, second son of Walter Leslie of Wardis and uncle of the 1st Baronet of the 1625 creation.

The 3rd Baronet was a diplomat and writer. As of 2026 the title is marked "dormant" on the Official Roll. The Leslie baronets of Glaslough are in remainder to the Leslie baronets of Wardis and Findrassie.

== Leslie baronets, of Glaslough (1876) ==
- Sir John Leslie, 1st Baronet (1822–1916)
- Sir John Leslie, 2nd Baronet (1857–1944)
- Sir John Randolph Leslie, 3rd Baronet (1885–1971)
- Sir John Norman Ide Leslie, 4th Baronet (1916–2016)
- Shaun Rudolf Christopher Leslie, presumed 5th Baronet (born 1947), heir to his uncle the 4th Baronet

The 5th Baronet does not appear on the Official Roll.

== Extended family ==
Lionel Alister David Leslie (1900–1987), fourth son of the 2nd Baronet, was a sculptor, author and explorer. Desmond Leslie, younger son of the 3rd Baronet, was a film maker, writer and musician. Anita Leslie, daughter of the 3rd Baronet, was a writer; her works include Lady Randolph Churchill: The Story of Jennie Jerome.

== Notes ==
Baronetage of the United Kingdom
Preceded by Gilpin baronets	Leslie baronets of Glaslough; 21 February 1876	Succeeded by Greenall baronets
