= Oranmore (disambiguation) =

Oranmore may refer to:

- Oranmore, a town on the outskirts of the city of Galway in Ireland
  - Oranmore Castle, a castle in the town of Oranmore, County Galway
- Oranmore, Ontario, a community in the township of Magnetawan, Ontario, Canada

== See also ==
- Oran Mor (disambiguation)
