= Etheldreda Laing =

British photographer

Etheldreda Janet Laing
- Born: Etheldreda Janet Winkfield; 1872; Ely, United Kingdom
- Died: 22 December 1960 (aged 87–88); Westminster, United Kingdom
- Known for: Photography
- Spouse: Charles Miskin Laing (m. 1895)

Etheldreda Janet Laing (née Winkfield; 1872–1960) was a British photographer who is remembered for her early Autochrome photographs, which she began taking in 1908.

== Biography ==
Born in Ely in 1872, Etheldreda was the daughter of Richard Winkfield, head of the King's School. After studying drawing in Cambridge, she married the barrister Charles Miskin Laing in 1895, after which the couple lived in Oxford. In 1899, they moved to Bury Knowle House in the Oxford district of Headington. Enthralled with photography, which she appears to have practiced since the late 1890s, Etheldreda had her own darkroom built in the house. She showed an immediate interest in the Autochrome colour process when the plates first became available in 1907. From 1908 she took many photographs of her daughters Janet and Iris in the garden. In later life she painted miniatures and joined the Royal Miniature Society.

Photography was a highly coveted and respected field for women during the Belle Époque, and like many photographers of her generation, Laing focused on photographing her daughters. Furthermore, with the use of Autochrome, it became an extremely expensive hobby: in 1913, a box containing four plates (with the sizes used by Laing) cost more than the average salary of a British worker at the time. From this perspective, Laing managed to adapt quickly to this colored mechanism, and through this, with a talent for composition and confidence with colors, she became an expert in this technique. Around 30 image plates are in the National Media Museum.

Laing showed great care in her compositions, taking carefully posed shots, mainly in the garden where the light was good. There is also an indoor photograph of Janet in Japanese kimono, which was popular at the time. It probably required an exposure of up to one minute.

== Daughters ==
Iris Carola Laing
- Iris sitting in a chair, circa 1908
- Born: 3 May 1903; Headington, Oxfordshire
- Died: 14 March 1994 (aged 90); Hove, East Sussex, England
- Spouse(s): Donald Alexander Frazer (m. 1940; died 1955) Shane Leslie (m. 1958, died)
- Parents: Charles Miskin Laing (father); Etheldreda Janet Laing (mother)
- Relatives: Anita Leslie (stepdaughter); John Leslie (stepson); Desmond Leslie (stepson); Sir Winston Churchill (1st cousin of her second husband)

Janet Marian Laing
- Janet Laing, circa 1908
- Born: 18 January 1898; Oxford
- Died: 5 September 1985 (aged 87); Worcestershire, England
- Spouse(s): Howard Montague Bulmer de Sales La Terriere (m. 1938, died)
- Parents: Charles Miskin Laing (father); Etheldreda Janet Laing (mother)
- Relatives: Bulmer La Terriere (father-in-law)

During Etheldreda's life, and together with her first husband, Charles Miskin Laing, in 1898 and 1903, they had two daughters, Janet and Iris, respectively.

From 1907 onwards, photographs were taken of his daughters using the autochrome process. She photographed her daughters in the garden of Bury Knowle House: some examples of these photographs include Two girls on a balcony, Girl with a parasol sitting on a bench, Two girls together in a garden, Girl with a bouquet of flowers.

=== Janet Marian Laing ===
In early 1898, Janet was born in Oxford.

=== Iris Carola Laing ===
Iris was born at Bury Knowle House in 1903 and on June 16 of the same year was baptized at Holy Trinity Church in Headington Quarry.

In 1940, at the age of 37, Iris married Captain Donald Alexander Frazer, changing her name to Iris Carola Frazer. On June 15, 1955, Donald died in London at the age of 59. Approximately 3 years later, in 1958, she married Sir John Randolph Shane Leslie, 3rd Baronet of Glaslough, who was 72 years old. He styled himself Sir Shance Leslie and was a relative of Sir Winston Churchill. This was her last marriage, and they remained together until Shane's death in 1971. Iris died a little over 20 years later, in 1994, at the age of 90, dying childless.

In 1978, Iris, then 75 years old, dated these portraits to 1908, estimating that she appeared to be about five years old. However, she may just as easily have been seven or eight, which seems more plausible when considering the history of the Autochrome process and Laing’s exhibition record.
