= Shane Leslie =

Anglo-Irish diplomat and writer (1885–1971)

Sir John Randolph Leslie, 3rd Baronet
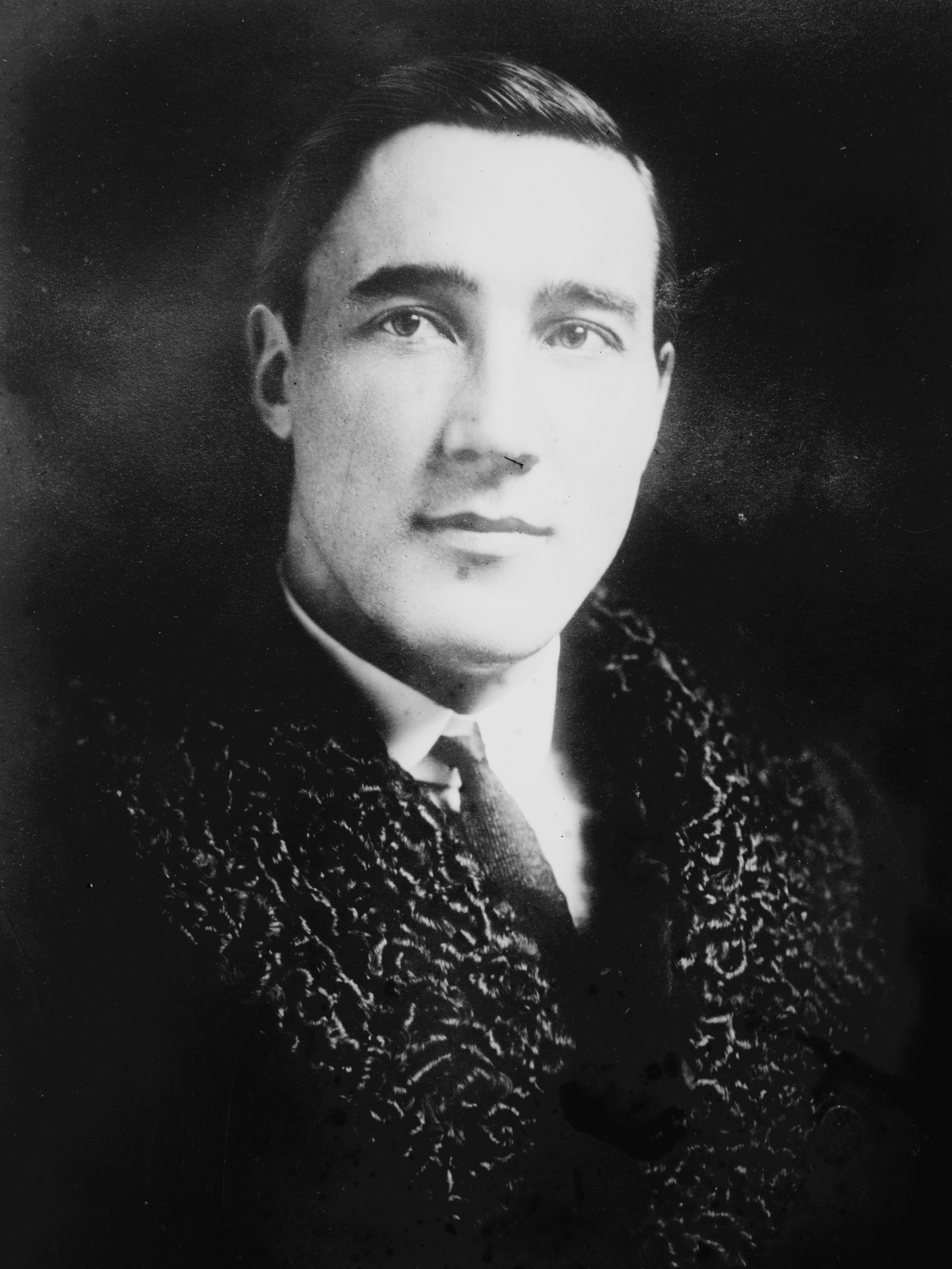
- Born: 24 September 1885; Castle Leslie, County Monaghan, Ireland
- Died: 14 August 1971 (aged 85); 15b Palmeira Court, Hove, East Sussex, England
- Education: Ludgrove School; Eton College
- Alma mater: King's College, Cambridge
- Occupations: Writer, diplomat, literary critic, public speaker
- Spouse(s): Marjorie Ide (m. 1912; died 1951) Iris Frazer (m. 1958)
- Children: 3
- Parents: Sir John Leslie, 2nd Baronet (father); Leonie Jerome (mother)
- Relatives: Anita Leslie (daughter); John Leslie (son); Desmond Leslie (son); Leonard W. Jerome (maternal grandfather); Jennie Churchill (aunt); Sir Winston Churchill (1st cousin); Henry Clay Ide (father-in-law)
- Writing career
- Genres: Novel, biography, translation, criticism
- Notable work: The Cantab

Sir John Randolph Leslie, 3rd Baronet (24 September 1885 – 14 August 1971), commonly known by his nickname, Shane Leslie, was an Anglo-Irish diplomat and writer. He was a first cousin of Sir Winston Churchill. In 1908, Leslie became a Roman Catholic and supported Irish Home Rule.

== Childhood and education ==
Leslie was born in Glaslough, County Monaghan, into a wealthy Anglo-Irish landowning family (49,968 acres). His father was Sir John Leslie, 2nd Baronet, and his mother, Leonie Jerome, was the sister of Winston Churchill's mother, Jennie. Both were daughters of Leonard W. Jerome. His ancestor, the Right Reverend John Leslie, Bishop of the Isles, moved from Scotland to Ireland in 1633 when he was made Bishop of Raphoe in County Donegal and was made Bishop of Clogher in 1661. Bishop Leslie was a vocal opponent of Oliver Cromwell.

Together with his brother Norman, Leslie's early education began at home where a German governess, Clara Woelke, was their first teacher. As children the brothers had more contact with servants than they had with their parents. Leslie's own daughter, Anita, said that "In my parents' view schools performed the same functions that kennels did for dogs. They were places where pets could be conveniently deposited while their owners travelled."

Leslie was educated at Ludgrove School, then Eton College and King's College, Cambridge. While at Cambridge University he became a Roman Catholic and a supporter of Irish Home Rule. He adopted an anglicised Irish variant of his name ("Shane"). Not overly impressed by Eton, Leslie refused to send his own sons there. They were educated at Roman Catholic Benedictine schools: Jack at Downside School and Desmond at Ampleforth College.

== Adult life ==
In the January 1910 general election Leslie stood as the Irish Parliamentary Party candidate for the Londonderry City division, losing by just 57 votes. In the second general election later that year he was again narrowly defeated by the Unionist candidate.

Before World War I, Leslie travelled extensively and in 1912 he married Marjorie Ide, the youngest daughter of Henry Clay Ide, then United States ambassador to Spain and former Governor-General of the Philippines. His parents and other family members moved temporarily to London at the outbreak of war.

During the war he was in a British Ambulance Corps, until invalided out; he was then sent to Washington, D.C. to help the British Ambassador, Sir Cecil Spring Rice, soften Irish-American hostility towards England and obtain American intervention in the war in the aftermath of the 1916 Easter Rising in Dublin and the execution of its leaders. But he also looked to Ireland for inspiration when writing and edited a literary magazine that contained much Irish verse. He became a supporter of the ideals of Irish nationalism, although not physical force republicanism.

In the 1918 election the Irish Parliamentary Party lost massively to Sinn Féin, putting an end to Shane Leslie's political career, but as the first cousin of Winston Churchill he remained a primary witness to much that was said and done outside the official record during the negotiation of the Anglo-Irish Treaty of 1921. Disappointed, he felt unwanted in Ireland and abandoned by the British. Like many members of the landed gentry from the 1880s who were obliged to turn to other occupations, he could no longer rely on income from landholdings.

He wrote extensively, in a wide range of styles, in verse, prose, and polemic, over several decades. His writings include The End of a Chapter (1916), while hospitalised during the Great War, The Oppidan (1922), a roman à clef about his life and contemporaries at Eton, an edition of the Letters of Herbert Cardinal Vaughan to Lady Herbert of Lea (1942), and a biography Mrs Fitzherbert: a life chiefly from unpublished sources (1939), together with an edition of her letters (with Maria Anne Fitzherbert), The letters of Mrs Fitzherbert and connected papers; being the second volume of the life of Mrs. Fitzherbert (1944). He also wrote Mark Sykes: His Life and Letters (1923), a biography of the English traveller, Conservative Party politician and diplomatic advisor. He advised budding novelist Scott Fitzgerald on the title of his 1st novel, they shared correspondence with the future Mnsg William A Hemmick who was Fitzgerald's teacher at the now shut Newman School.

A passionate advocate of reforestation, he found the business of running an estate uncreative and boring, and transferred the estate entailed to him to his eldest son, John Norman Leslie, who succeeded as the 4th Baronet. He transferred St Patrick's Purgatory on Lough Derg to the Roman Catholic Bishop of Clogher, Eugene O'Callaghan.

The wealth of the Leslies had waned by the 1930s following the Wall Street crash of 1929 and a farm that was loss making. In his unpublished memoirs, he wrote "a gentleman's standing in his world was signalled by his list of clubs and it was worth paying hundreds of pounds in subs". They continued to maintain their lifestyle, involving attendance at the London season and the entertainment of distinguished visitors, including Anthony Eden at Glaslough. At the outbreak of World War II in 1939 he joined the Home Guard. He spent the remainder of his life between Glaslough and London.

== Family ==
He was the elder son of Sir John Leslie, 2nd Baronet, and Leonie Blanche Jerome. He married, firstly, Marjorie Ide, daughter of General Henry Clay Ide, on 11 June 1912 and had two sons and one daughter:

- Anita Theodosia Moira Rodzianko King (21 November 1914 – 5 November 1985), novelist and biographer; was married (secondly) to Commander Bill King, World War II submarine commander and yachtsman; had two children; friend of Hazel Lavery who was reputedly a paramour of Michael Collins.
- Sir John Norman Ide Leslie, 4th Baronet (6 December 1916 – 18 April 2016), popularly known as Sir Jack Leslie, never married or sired children.
- Desmond Arthur Peter Leslie (29 June 1921 – 21 February 2001).

His first wife Marjorie died on 8 February 1951. On 30 May 1958 at the Catholic Church of St Peter & Edward, Westminster, Shane Leslie (72) married Mrs Iris Carola Frazer (55), who was the daughter of Charles Miskin Laing and Etheldreda Janet Laing.

He died at 15b Palmeira Court, Hove, Sussex on 14 April 1971, aged 85 and a requiem mass was held for him in Westminster Cathedral on 12 October 1971.

== See also ==
- Commander Bill King

Baronetage of the United Kingdom
| Preceded by John Leslie | Baronet (of Glaslough); 1944–1971 | Succeeded by John Leslie |
