= Action of 17 July 1944 =

Submarine engagement in World War II

- Part of The Pacific War of the Second World War
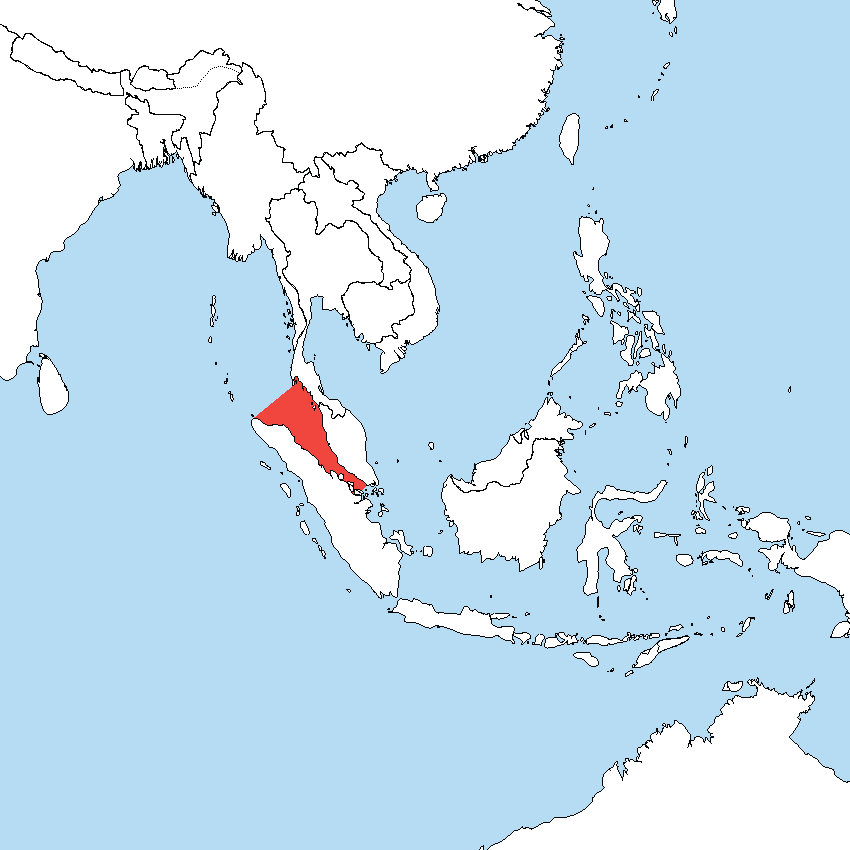
- Strait of Malacca (in red)
Date	17 July 1944
Location	off Penang, Malaysia, Indian Ocean
Result	British victory

Belligerents
United Kingdom	Japan

Commanders and leaders
Bill King	Suwa Koichiro

Strength
Submarine Telemachus	Submarine I-166

Casualties and losses
None	I-166 sunk 88 killed

The action of 17 July 1944 was a submarine engagement of the Second World War. It resulted in the sinking of the Japanese Navy Kadai-type submarine I-166 in the Strait of Malacca by the Royal Navy submarine HMS Telemachus (Commander Bill King).

Operating for the first time with the Eastern Fleet at Colombo in Ceylon, on 13 July King had sailed into One Fathom bank to intercept Japanese traffic between Penang and Singapore. They waited until 17 July when submerged, the ASDIC operator alerted King to the sound of propellers and the watch soon spotted a Japanese submarine, I-166.

== Action ==
Despite misty conditions, Telemachus tracked I-166 for 30 minutes, waited until it was less than a mile distant and reached the firing point beam on. At 07:20 King fired a spread of six Torpex warhead torpedoes at 1,500 yd (1,400 m), and then tried to swing the boat to fire her stern torpedoes. This manoeuvre failed and Telemachus lost control and briefly broke surface. Ninety-two seconds after the launch, one torpedo hit the stern of I-166. The Japanese boat sank immediately and eighty-eight men were killed. Lt Suwa and the navigating officer were blown overboard and seven hours later they were picked up by Malayan fishermen.

Soon after the sinking at 5°10'N, 100°0'E, the Japanese attempted to intercept and sink Telemachus but failed. Telemachus returned to Colombo and King was awarded a Distinguished Service Cross (DSC) on 16 January 1945 "For outstanding courage, skill and determination in one of H.M. Submarines in successful patrols in Far Eastern waters" (specifically the sinking of the I-166).

== Bibliography ==
- King, William (1983). Dive and Attack: A Submariners Story. London: William Kimber. ISBN 0-7183-0500-0.
- The South-East Asia Operations and Central Pacific Advance. War with Japan. Vol. IV. London: HMSO [Ministry of Defence (Navy)]. 1995 [1957]. pp. 183–184. ISBN 0-11-772820-9.
