= Anita Leslie =

Irish biographer

Anne Theodosia Moira King (née Leslie; first married name Rodzianko; 21 November 1914 – 5 November 1985), generally known as Anita Leslie, was an American-born Anglo-Irish biographer and writer. She was a first cousin once removed of the British wartime Prime Minister Sir Winston Churchill.

== Childhood and education ==
The eldest of three children born in New York City, to a wealthy Anglo-Irish landowning family (49,968 acres). Anita Theodosia Moira Leslie, alongside her brothers (Sir John Leslie, 4th Baronet and Desmond Leslie) were born to Sir John Randolph Leslie, 3rd Baronet (a.k.a. Shane Leslie) and his wife, Majorie Ide, the Vermont-born daughter of General Henry Clay Ide the US ambassador to Spain.

Anita described her schooling as ‘abysmal’. She had more than a dozen governesses and attended seven schools in Britain and France. Her 1981 autobiography, The Gilt and the gingerbread, details her early childhood and eventual decision to leave the home of her grandparents and play her part in the Second World War.

== Second World War ==
During the war Anita Leslie joined the Mechanised Transport Corps, as a fully trained mechanic and ambulance driver. Anita was stationed in Cairo, Lebanon, Syria, and Jordan during the intervening years. In 1944 she drove ambulances with the Free French army. During that time she worked in northern France and liberated a V2 Rocket factory in Germany. She wrote letters home from Hitler's office in the Reich Chancellery and took part in the Victory parade in Berlin.

Anita met future husband Bill King in Lebanon in 1943, where King served for 5 months as executive officer of the submarine base at Beirut.

She was on a skiing trip after doing duty in Africa in the Mechanised Transport Corps in 1940–42, although a letter mentions her being in Beirut in 1941–42.

She served as an ambulance driver in the French Army from 1944-45. For the latter, she was awarded the Croix de Guerre in 1945 by General Charles de Gaulle.

== Post-war life and marriage ==
On 1 January 1949, Leslie married King. After the war, Anita took up farming and was an avid fox hunter, as was her husband Bill. In 1946, the Kings bought Oranmore Castle, a 15th-century Norman keep built on Galway Bay in county Galway, Ireland for £200.

Other sources report that Anita Leslie-King was given the castle by her mother, who had bought it in 1946. For a while, the Kings lived in a hunting lodge outside Oranmore village, designed by Bill, and built while he and Anita went on a "world sailing cruise." To help combat his wife's asthma, King developed an organic farm and garden to feed his family. Both Anita Leslie's mother and grandmother had suffered from asthma.

== Family ==
She married, firstly in 1936, Paul Rodzianko (1903-1993 a nephew of Mikhail Rodzianko) and secondly, Commander Bill King in 1949. During World War II Bill served as a submarine commander and later a transatlantic and circumnavigator yachtsman. The Kings had two children:

- Richard Tarka Bourke King (born 1949) has two children, William and Olivia.
- Leonie Rose King, Mrs Finn (born 1951) married celebrated Irish folk musician Alec Finn and still resides in Oranmore, County Galway. She and Finn have two children.

== Published works ==
- 1937: Rodin, Immortal Peasant. (Prentice-Hall, inc)
- 1940: Mannerheim: An Intimate Picture of a Great Soldier and Statesman. Co-authored with her then husband Paul Rodzianko. (Jarrolds Limited)
- 1948: Train to Nowhere. (Hutchinson)
- 1952: Love in a Nutshell. (Hutchinson)
- 1954: The Remarkable Mr Jerome. (Henry Holt); 1955: The Fabulous Leonard Jerome. (Hutchinson)
- 1960: Mrs Fitzherbert. The love affair of Mrs. Fitzherbert and the Prince of Wales, who later became George IV of the United Kingdom. (Scribner)
- 1966: Mr. Frewen of England: A Victorian Adventurer. (Hutchinson)
- 1969: Lady Randolph Churchill: The Story of Jennie Jerome. (Scribner)
- 1973: The Marlborough House Set. (Doubleday)
- 1974: Edwardians in Love. (Hutchinson)
- 1975: Francis Chichester. (Hutchinson: Hodder and Stoughton)
- 1976: Cousin Clare: The Tempestuous Career of Clare Sheridan. (Hutchinson)
- 1978: Madame Tussaud, Waxworker Extraordinaire. (Hutchinson: Hodder and Stoughton)
- 1981: The Gilt and the Gingerbread: An Autobiography. (Hutchinson)
- 1983: A Story Half Told: A Wartime Autobiography. (Hutchinson)
- 1985: Cousin Randolph: The Life of Randolph Churchill. Profiles the son of Churchill who, with his many advantages - good looks, diverse abilities, and connections - had to make his mark in spite of his mother's diffidence and father's disinterest. (Hutchinson)

== See also ==
- Commander Bill King
- Desmond Leslie
- Sir John Leslie, 4th Baronet
- Shane Leslie
- Castle Leslie
