= Bill King (Royal Navy officer) =

British naval officer, yachtsman, author

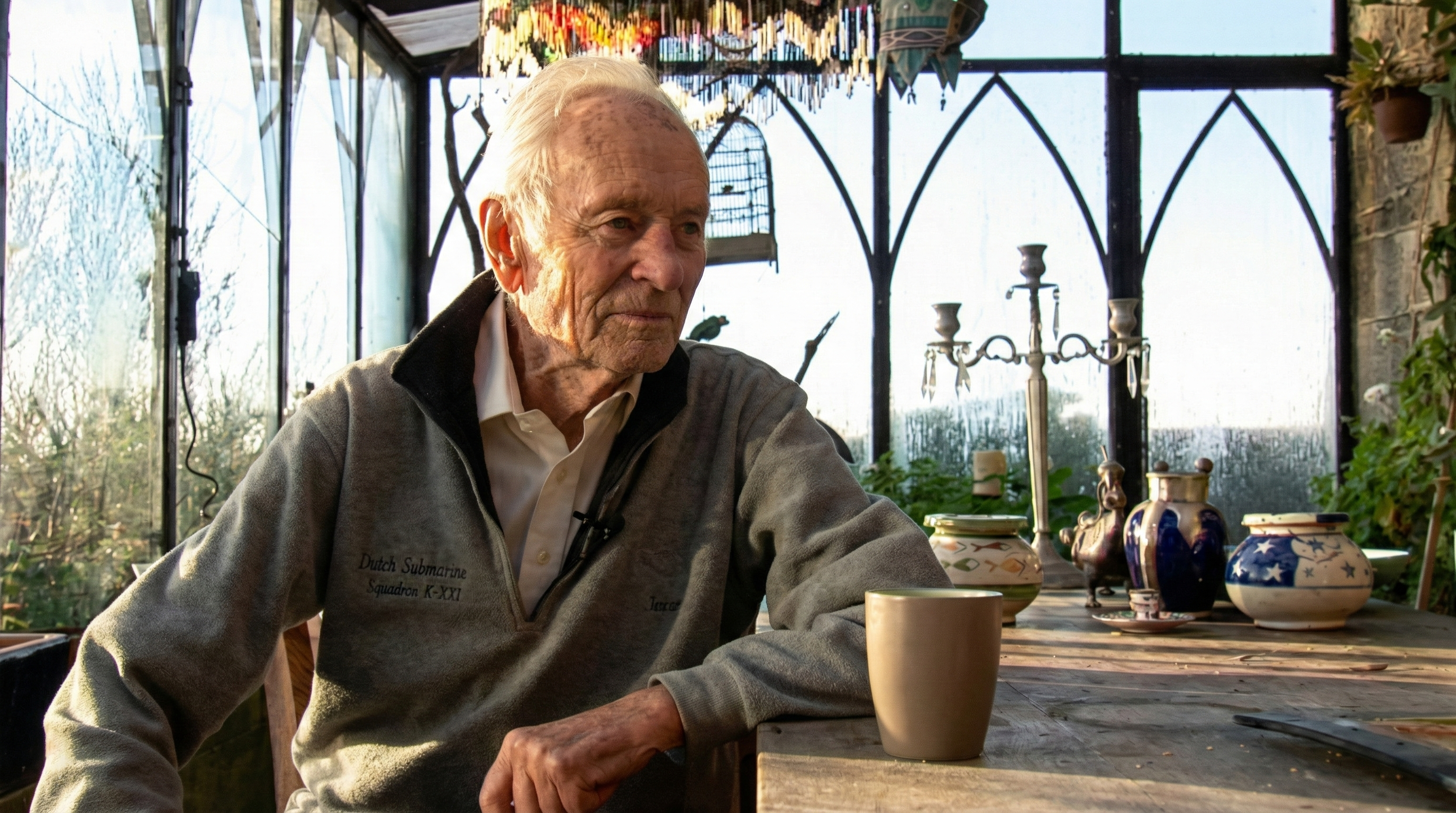
- Bill King
- Born: William Donald Aelian King; 23 June 1910
- Died: 21 September 2012 (aged 102)
- Relatives: Anita Leslie (spouse); William King (grandfather)
- Military career
- Allegiance: United Kingdom
- Branch: Royal Navy
- Service years: December 1927 – April 1946
- Rank: Commander
- Nickname: Bill
- Unit: Submarine Service
- Commands: Commanding officer: HMS Snapper (1939–40); HMS Trusty (1941); HMS Telemachus (1943–45); Executive officer: HMS Medway II (1943); HMS Forth (1945–46)
- Conflicts: North Sea (1939–40); Mediterranean Sea (1941); Action of 17 July 1944
- Awards: Distinguished Service Order (1940); Distinguished Service Cross (1940); Bar to the DSO (1945); Arctic Emblem (2006); Others: 1939–1945 Star, Atlantic Star, Africa Star, Burma Star, War Medal 1939–1945; Civilian: Blue Water Medal (1975)
- Other work: Farmer; Solo circumnavigator (1969–73); Author (1958–97)

Commander William Donald Aelian King, DSO & Bar, DSC (23 June 1910 – 21 September 2012) was a British naval officer, yachtsman and author. He was the oldest participant in the first solo non-stop, around-the-world yacht race, the Sunday Times Golden Globe Race, and the only person to command a British submarine on both the first and last days of World War II.

Brought up by his mother and grandmother, King went to the Royal Naval College in Dartmouth. He was first assigned to the battleship Resolution, and later became commanding officer of the submarine Snapper. He commanded three separate RN submarines in World War II, and was promoted to commander and awarded seven medals during the war. King not only survived World War II, but succeeded in a singlehanded circumnavigation in 1973 on his third attempt. During the latter journey, he managed to reach port despite a collision with a large sea creature 400 miles (640 km) southwest of Australia.

== Family background and childhood ==
William Donald Aelian King was born to William Albert de Courcy King and Georgina Marie MacKenzie in 1910. King's great-grandfather, William King, was Chair of Mineralogy and Geology at Queen's College, Galway. He was appointed when the College first opened in 1849. William King was the first to argue that Neanderthals were a species separate from modern humans.

King's father, William Albert de Courcy King, was born in 1875. He married Georgina Marie, daughter of a "Mr. D. F. MacKenzie, of Collingwood Grange, Camberley, Surrey" in June 1908. De Courcy King attended Royal Military Academy, Woolwich and then the School of Military Engineering, Chatham. He received his commission as a second lieutenant in the Royal Engineers in 1894. Prior to World War I, his postings included Saint Lucia in the 1890s, where the Engineers constructed gun emplacements and fortified coal stations, and South Africa, where the Engineers built blockhouses (designed by Major S. R. Rice, RE) during the Anglo Boer War. De Courcy King was awarded the Distinguished Service Order (DSO) in 1916 while a major, during the First World War, serving later as Lieutenant-Colonel with the 36th (Ulster) Division in Belgium. He was killed on 27 May 1917 at the age of 42, and lies buried at Dranoutre Military Cemetery in Belgium.

As a result of his father's death, Bill King was brought up by his mother and grandmother. His MacKenzie grandmother was a formidable woman who learned to ski at the age of 75 and still sailed in her eighties.

== Early naval career ==
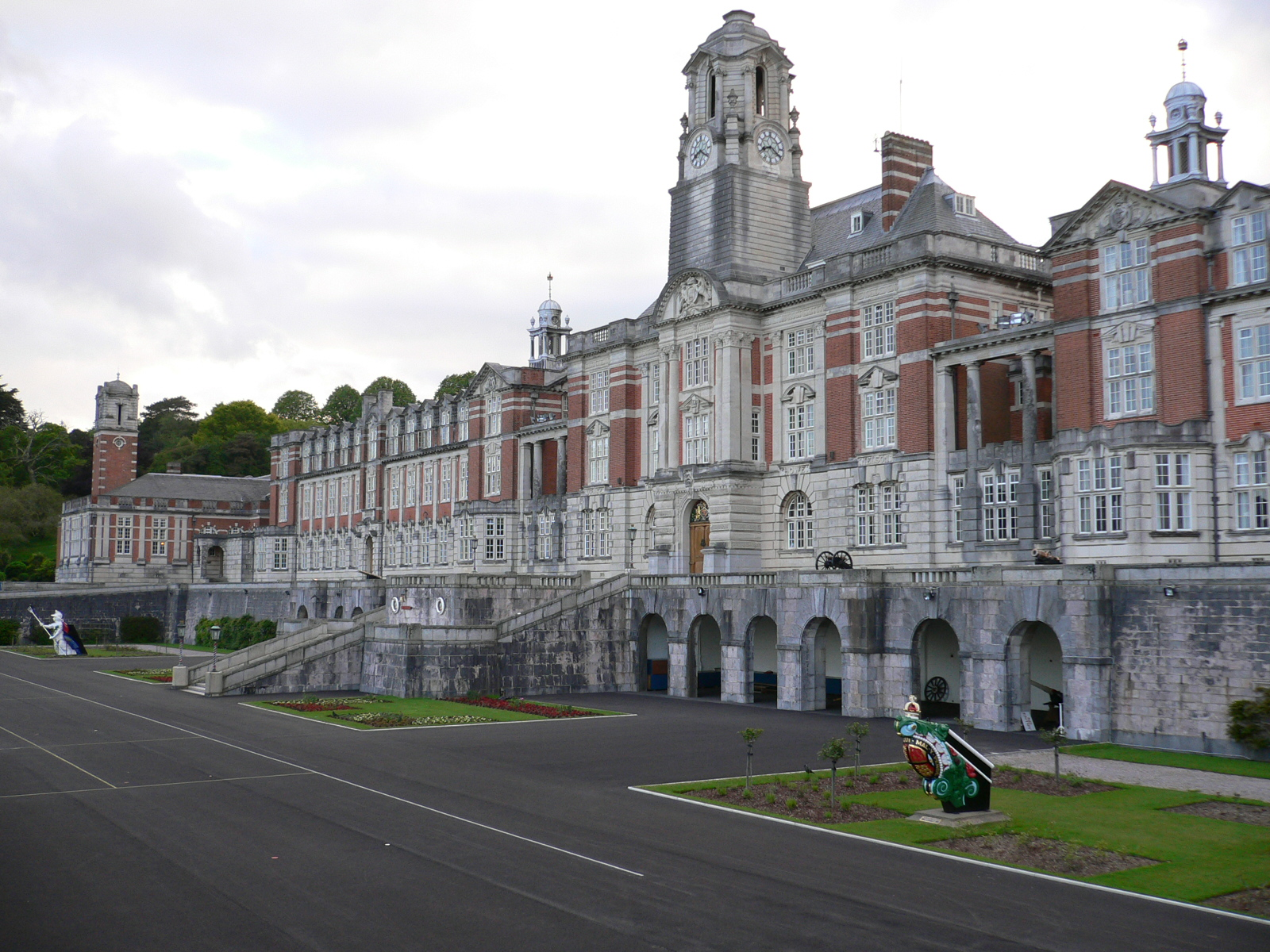
The Royal Naval College, Dartmouth, which King attended from 1922, when he was twelve.

After preparatory school, at the age of twelve, King was sent to the Royal Naval College, Dartmouth, in Devon. In the 2006 documentary about the disastrous 1968 round-the-world yacht race; Deep Water, King said that he had been a boxer and a "champion long-distance runner" in his youth.

From December 1927 to April 1930, King was posted to the battleship Resolution, which served in the Mediterranean.

During this time he became a midshipman. From June 1932 to January 1934, he was posted to the submarine Orpheus, which served near China. He was promoted to lieutenant in 1932. In April 1935, King was appointed first lieutenant of the service vessel Pigmy, formerly the Polish sailing vessel Iskra, used by the Royal Navy at Gibraltar to supply the 8th Submarine Squadron.

After seven months, he was transferred to Starfish, then to Narwhal, before being sent to Portsmouth for the Submarine Command Course at HMS Dolphin. Having successfully qualified to command a submarine, a four-month stint aboard the submarine depot ship Titania followed, before, in May 1939, King travelled to Malta to take command of Snapper.

== World War II ==
During World War II, King served in three submarines of the Royal Navy: Snapper, Trusty, and Telemachus. He patrolled the North Sea, the Mediterranean, and the Far East.

At the outbreak of the war, King and Snapper were sent to patrol the North Sea. King was commanding officer on Snapper from 16 April 1939 to April 1940. On 3 December 1939, Snapper sustained a direct hit from a British aircraft while returning to Harwich after a patrol, but without taking damage.

Between December 1939 and July 1940, Snapper sank six ships, mainly in the Skagerrak Strait. These include the tanker Moonsund, the merchant ship Florida, the minesweepers H. M. Behrens and Carsten Janssen, and the armed trawlers Portland and Cygnus. Snapper was later lost under command of Lieutenant Geoffrey Vernon Prowse, either in a minefield or sunk by German depth charges.

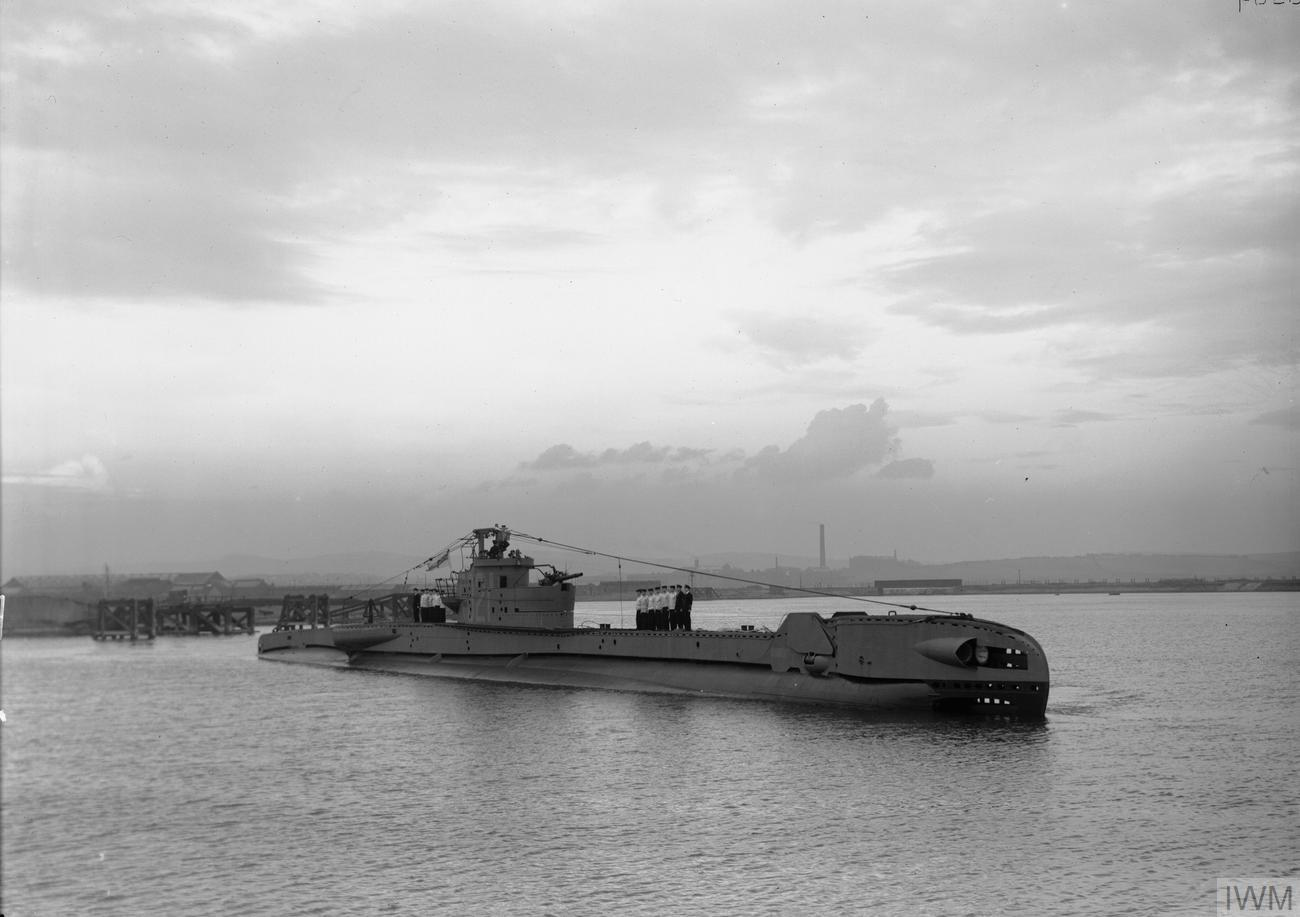
HMS Telemachus, which King commanded from 1943 to 1945.

In 1941, King served on the T-class submarine Trusty in the Mediterranean Sea. On 4 December 1941 Trusty unsuccessfully launched torpedoes against a boat which may have been the Italian torpedo boat Orsa.

From 21 July 1943 to August 1945, King was commanding officer of the T-class submarine Telemachus. Telemachus dropped off a special forces unit in western Malaya in October 1944.

Operating from a joint British-Dutch base at Ceylon, Telemachus sank the Japanese Kadai-class submarine I-166 in the Strait of Malacca on 17 July 1944. Telemachus tracked I-166 for 30 minutes, then fired a spread of six torpedoes. One torpedo hit, and sank the Japanese boat with 89 lives lost; five men on bridge watch survived to be rescued by the Japanese.

During the war, King was promoted to commander, and awarded seven medals, including the DSO on 9 May 1940 for "daring, endurance and resource in the conduct of hazardous and successful operations in His Majesty's Submarines against the enemy", and the Distinguished Service Cross on 6 September 1940 "for bravery and determination during arduous and successful patrols in H.M. Submarines" both whilst in command of Snapper.

A bar was added to his DSO on 16 January 1945 "For outstanding courage, skill and determination in one of H.M. Submarines in successful patrols in Far Eastern waters" (specifically the sinking of I-166). In 2006, he received an eighth medal, the Arctic Emblem.

King ended his Royal Navy career as executive officer of the submarine depot ship Forth, an appointment he held from 1 September 1945 to April 1946. His formal retirement came on 9 May 1948.

== Post-war life and marriage ==
On 1 January 1949, King married Anita Leslie, a divorcée, whose full name was Anita Theodosia Moira Leslie Rodzianko 1914–1984). She was the eldest child of Sir John Randolph Shane Leslie, 3rd Baronet (aka Shane Leslie), and his wife Marjorie Ide, the Vermont-born daughter of the US ambassador to Spain.

Bill and Anita probably met in Lebanon in 1943, where King served for 5 months as executive officer of the submarine base at Beirut. She was on a skiing trip after doing duty in Africa in the Motor Transport Corps in 1940–42, although a letter mentions her being in Beirut in 1941–42. Leslie-King then became an ambulance driver in the French Army from 1944 to 1945. For the latter, she was awarded the Croix de Guerre in 1945 by General Charles de Gaulle. As Anita Leslie, she wrote over a dozen books, including Love in a Nutshell (1952), The Remarkable Mr. Jerome: The Life and Times of Leonard Jerome, Sir Winston Churchill's American Grandfather (1954). In 1974 she wrote the biography of Francis Chichester, the first person to sail around the world single-handedly with only one stop. The Kings had two children.

After the war, King took up farming and was an avid fox hunter, as was his wife. In 1946, the Kings bought Oranmore Castle, a 15th century Norman keep built on Galway Bay Ireland for £200. Other sources report that Anita Leslie-King was given the castle by her mother, who had bought it in 1946.

For a while, the Kings lived in a hunting lodge outside Oranmore village, designed by Bill, and built while he and Anita went on a "world sailing cruise." To help combat his wife's asthma, King developed an organic farm and garden to feed his family. Both Anita Leslie's mother and grandmother had suffered asthma.

== Solo circumnavigation ==
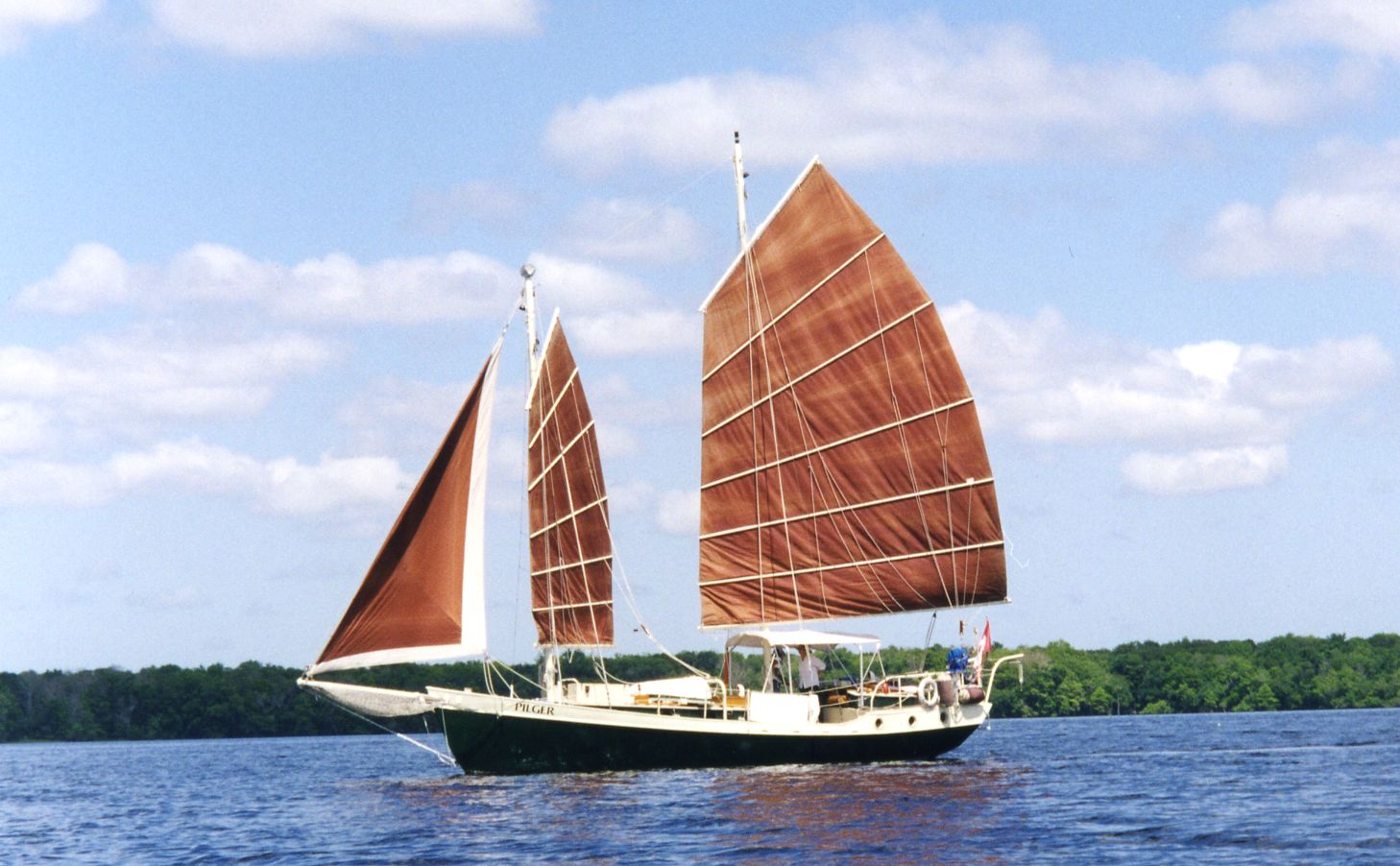
A junk rigged schooner, similar to the Galway Blazer II with which Bill King sailed around the world in 1973.

By 1967, King was intent on sailing around the world by himself. He had a boat built for this purpose at Souter's yard at Cowes, Isle of Wight.

King's boat, the two-masted Galway Blazer II, a cold-molded plywood schooner, was specially designed for him by Angus Primrose. It is not certain whether the boat was named after The Galway Blazers, a local fox hunting club in Galway, Ireland, which dates to 1839.

Based on boats he had seen in China, the 42-foot (13 m) schooner had a junk rig (a sail stiffened by battens). In this regard Galway Blazer II was similar to Jester, the junk-rigged Folkboat used by former Royal Marine Colonel Herbert Hasler in the first single-handed cross-Atlantic race (OSTAR).

King, Hasler and Primrose had "teamed up" to design the boat, which was displayed "at the London Boat Show in January 1968". King's intention to sail around the world was overtaken by the institution in March 1968 of the Sunday Times Golden Globe Race. Aged 58, King became the oldest participant in what was the first organised round the world solo yacht race. The building of the boat and the preparations for the race were featured in a Look at Life short film entitled single-handed sailors.

In Deep Water, King explained that he joined the race as a means of recovering psychologically from fifteen years of service in submarines. This, he said, had left him "a nervous wreck". He had planned to sail around the world before he heard of the race, which "sort of caught up with me." An aunt's legacy provided him with the means to finance the boat.

King was sponsored by the Daily Express and Sunday Express newspapers.

One of the shortcomings of the boat was that it had neither guard rails or shrouds to hold on to. King solved this problem with a steel wire that stretched from bow to stern, to which he clipped a harness. His method was then copied by fellow racers Loïck Fougeron and Bernard Moitessier.

King started the race on 24 August 1968. During the race, King lived on raw food, such as dried fruit stirred into almond paste and green sprouts that he grew on board. He read through the New Testament, the Qur'an, and Edwin Arnold's 1880 Buddhist writing, The Light of Asia, as well as "all the best novels, such as Tolstoy". He said that he did not get depressed during the journey, because of the beauty surrounding him. "You are...alone with God...there's no opportunity to sin".

King lost radio contact during the race. On 31 October, Galway Blazer II capsized in 50-foot (15 m) waves northeast off Gough Island while King rested, breaking both masts. King had to be towed to Cape Town, South Africa.

In 1969, King again tried and failed to circumnavigate in Galway Blazer II. In 1970, he was ready for another attempt, again using Galway Blazer II. Ill-health and hull damage forced him to put ashore at Australia. After departing on 12 December 1971, a large sea creature (a whale or shark) damaged his boat about 400 miles (640 km) southwest of Fremantle. "Only his skill and heroic efforts were able to keep the vessel afloat until jury repairs could be made."

King was below deck when he heard a shattering sound and saw the hull below the water line bulge inward and splinter. He rushed upstairs and heeled the boat so that the hole was lifted out of the water. He had to hang over the side and submerge himself to carry out emergency repairs with material that included thirteen ropes, sticky tape, collision covers, sheet copper, and sponge rubber. Then he had to fix the inside of the hull as well. After three days of work, he was able to return to Fremantle, "barely able to limp into port".

The 1970 journey was eventually successful, with King completing his global circumnavigation on 23 May 1973. In 1975, the Cruising Club of America awarded King the Blue Water Medal in recognition of his feat.

That same year, Galway Blazer II was sold to Peter Crowther, landlord of a Devon pub. Crowther wrote a book about his experiences with the boat, which was lost on 24 June 1996 during the tenth Singlehanded Transatlantic Race from Plymouth, England, to Newport, Rhode Island in the USA.

== Later life ==
In September 2007, King and his daughter Leonie, still lived at Oranmore Castle. His life's experiences continued to attract media attention, from film to music to art installation.

He was filmed for two documentaries about the Golden Globe Race; the 1960s BBC short Golden Globe – Lone Sailor Round the World Race and 2006's Deep Water. His war experiences still fascinate documentary film makers. King was interviewed for two planned productions, a 24 minute episode entitled "To Honour and Peace" for the proposed series entitled Bravery Beneath the Waves, and for The Stick & The Stars: The Life & Times of Commander Bill King.

Most recent attention arises from King's interaction with Akira Tsurukame and Katja Boonstra-Blom – the subject of print media articles, an exhibition, and video interviews. Tsurukame, son of the chief engineer who perished with I-166, in 2004 sought out King. King, Tsurukame, and Katja Boonstra, whose father was killed when I-166 sank the Dutch submarine K XVI, together planted a tree at Oranmore Castle to honour the fathers of the latter two.

The local paper, The Galway Advertiser, dubbed their threeway meeting at Oranmore Castle a "reconciliation". Subsequently Akira Tsurukame released video material of his interviews with Bill King on the internet. Two installations in July 2006 at the Project 06 art exhibition in Galway referenced King. Response to Japanese Peace and Reconciliation was arranged in Swan House, and featured art-works by his daughter Leonie King and grand-daughter Heather Finn. The Lost at Sea installation was a collaboration between Galway-based Cane 141, who set stories told by Bill King to electronic music, and visual artist Roisin Coyle. The latter installation has since been exhibited in Dublin, and in May 2007 at Grace Exhibition Space in New York City.

In 2009, Bill King's great nephew Luke Leslie produced the short film King of the Waves, which dramatised King's solo circumnavigation and encounter with the great white shark. It also included interviews with King himself. It was screened before King and his family in Oranmore, County Galway on his ninety-ninth birthday shortly before premiering at the 2009 Galway, Cork and Kerry film festivals.

King died in September 2012. At the time of his death, he was the oldest surviving World War II submarine commander.

== Published works ==
- 1958: The Stick and the Stars. (Hutchinson).
- 1969: Capsize. (Nautical Publishing
- 1975: Adventure in Depth.(Putnam Publishing).
- 1983: Dive and Attack. Revises and updates The Stick and the Stars, describes author's experiences during World War II. (W. Kimber/ Hutchinson)
- 1989: The Wheeling Stars : A Guide for Lone Sailors. Boston, London: Faber & Faber.
- 1997: Kamikaze: the Wind of God (Minerva Press)

== See also ==
- Anita Leslie King – Irish biographer
- Castle Leslie – Castellated house in County Monaghan, Ireland
- Oranmore Castle – Tower house in County Galway, Ireland
- Shane Leslie – Anglo-Irish diplomat and writer (1885–1971)
