= Oran Mor =

Oran Mor may refer to:

- Òran Mór, a restaurant and venue in Glasgow, Scotland
- Órán Mór, Irish name for Oranmore, a town in County Galway, Ireland
- Òran Mór Session, 2014 EP by Scottish band The Twilight Sad
- Oran Mor Pipe Band, a pipe band in Albany, New York
