= Noel McMeel =

Irish chef

Noel McMeel is a chef from Northern Ireland, who is the Executive Chef at The Bedford Hotel in Belfast, Northern Ireland. He describes his cooking as "modern Irish cuisine".

== Personal life ==
McMeel studied at the Northern Ireland Hotel and Catering College before training in a number of restaurants, including working for the well known Irish Chef Paul Rankin. He then earned a scholarship to attend Johnson & Wales University in Providence, Rhode Island. Following this, he worked in a number of establishments, including the Watergate Hotel in Washington, D.C. and Chez Panisse in San Francisco. He opened his own restaurant Trompets in the late 1990s.

== Notes ==
- Prior to his current post, McMeel was head chef at Castle Leslie, County Monaghan, Republic of Ireland, where he was responsible for the 300-guest vegetarian banquet at the wedding of Paul McCartney and Heather Mills in June 2002.
- He took part in the second series of the BBC cookery challenge Great British Menu, where he lost in the Northern Ireland heat to Richard Corrigan. He then returned for series three, but again lost, this time to Danny Millar.
