= Sir John Leslie, 4th Baronet =

Anglo-Irish baron; WWII POW

Captain Sir John Leslie, 4th Bt
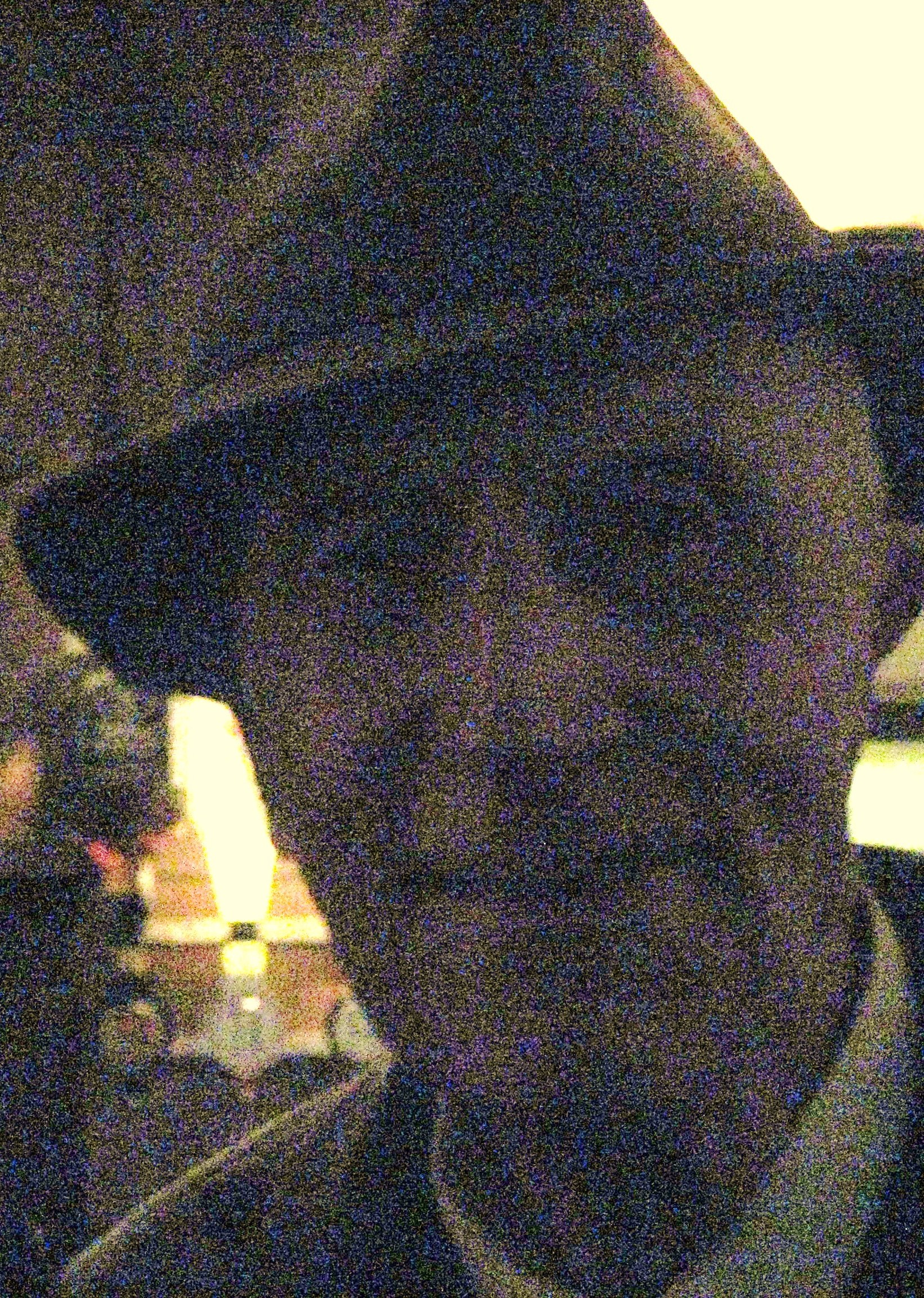
- Sir Jack Leslie in June 2009
- Born: John Norman Ide Leslie; 6 December 1916; New York City, New York, U.S.
- Died: 18 April 2016 (aged 99); Dublin, Ireland
- Education: Magdalene College, Cambridge
- Occupations: Soldier; baronet; television presenter; pianist

Captain Sir John Norman Ide Leslie, 4th Baronet (6 December 1916 – 18 April 2016), also known as Jack Leslie, was an Anglo-Irish baronet, soldier, and television presenter. He was the eldest son of Sir John Randolph Leslie, 3rd Baronet (also known as Shane Leslie), and Marjorie Ide. He inherited the baronetcy following his father's death in 1971.

== Early life and education ==
Leslie was born in New York City, New York, on 6 December 1916. He was educated at Downside School and later attended Magdalene College, Cambridge. Throughout his life, he maintained close ties to both his Anglo-Irish heritage and his American roots through his mother, Marjorie Ide, who was the daughter of General Henry Clay Ide, former Governor-General of the Philippines.

== Military career ==
During the Second World War, Leslie served as an officer in the Irish Guards. He fought in the Battle of France but was captured by German forces at Boulogne-sur-Mer, spending five years in various prisoner-of-war camps. His military service earned him recognition, including the Legion d'Honneur, which was presented to him at the French embassy in Dublin on 9 November 2015.

== Post-war life ==
After the war, Leslie relocated to New York City and later spent time travelling throughout Europe, eventually settling in Rome. At the age of 78, he returned to his family's ancestral home, Castle Leslie, in Ireland. In 2001, he celebrated his 85th birthday in Ibiza. Leslie gained some notoriety in 2002, when he inadvertently revealed the secret wedding location of Sir Paul McCartney and Heather Mills at Castle Leslie.

Leslie also became known for his appearances on television. In 2012, he was featured in the programme Secrets of the Manor House, which explored the history of British and Irish manor homes, including Castle Leslie. In 2015, he appeared in the TV series Tales of Irish Castles.

== Personal life and legacy ==
A lifelong bachelor, Leslie never married and had no children. He died in April 2016 at the age of 99. As of 9 August 2023, the Leslie baronetcy is listed as dormant.

In 2006, he published his autobiography titled Never A Dull Moment, recounting his varied life experiences, from his war service to his post-war adventures and later life at Castle Leslie.

== Family ==
Leslie was the eldest son of Sir John Randolph Leslie, 3rd Baronet and Marjorie Ide. He had an elder sister and a younger brother:

- Anita Theodosia Moira Rodzianko King (21 November 1914 – 5 November 1985), a novelist and biographer. Her second marriage was to Bill King, a World War II submarine commander and yachtsman. They had two children.
- Desmond Arthur Peter Leslie (29 June 1921 – 21 February 2001), a pilot, filmmaker, writer, and musician. He was married twice and had five children.

== See also ==
- Thyssen Family
- Castle Leslie

Baronetage of the United Kingdom
Preceded by John Randolph Leslie	Baronet (of Glaslough); 1971–2016	Succeeded by dormant
