= HMS Telemachus (P321) =

Submarine of the Royal Navy

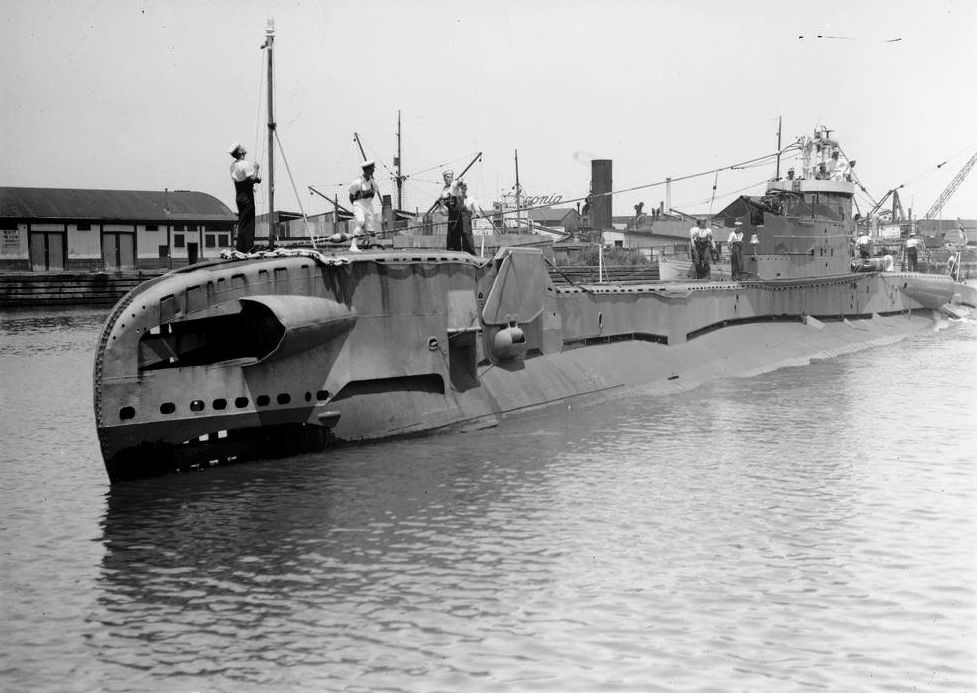
- HMS Telemachus

History

United Kingdom
- Name: HMS Telemachus
- Namesake: Telemachus
- Ordered: 3 August 1941
- Builder: Vickers-Armstrongs, Barrow
- Laid down: 25 August 1942
- Launched: 19 June 1943
- Commissioned: 25 October 1943
- Identification: Pennant number P321
- Motto: Per me tutus (Latin: "Safe through me")
- Honours and awards: Malaya 1944; Korea 1953
- Fate: Scrapped 1 August 1961
- Badge

General characteristics
- Class & type: British T-class submarine
- Displacement: 1,290 tons surfaced; 1,560 tons submerged
- Length: 276 ft 6 in (84.28 m)
- Beam: 25 ft 6 in (7.77 m)
- Draught: 12 ft 9 in (3.89 m) forward; 14 ft 7 in (4.45 m) aft
- Propulsion: Two shafts; Twin diesel engines 2,500 hp (1.86 MW) each; Twin electric motors 1,450 hp (1.08 MW) each
- Speed: 15.5 knots (28.7 km/h) surfaced; 9 knots (20 km/h) submerged
- Range: 4,500 nautical miles at 11 knots (8,330 km at 20 km/h) surfaced
- Test depth: 300 ft (91 m) max
- Complement: 61
- Armament: 6 internal forward-facing 21 inch (533 mm) torpedo tubes; 2 external forward-facing torpedo tubes; 2 external amidships rear-facing torpedo tubes; 1 external rear-facing torpedo tube, aft; 6 reload torpedoes; QF 4 inch (100 mm) deck gun; 3 anti aircraft machine guns

The second HMS Telemachus was a British submarine of the third group of the T class. She was built as P321 by Vickers-Armstrongs, Barrow, and launched on 19 June 1943. She served in Far Eastern waters for most of her wartime career, and was responsible for the sinking of the Japanese submarine I-166. Following the war she was deployed to Australia to operate with the Royal Australian Navy until 1959. She was scrapped in 1961.

== Design and description ==
Telemachus was part of group three of the British T-class submarines. She was completed by builders Vickers-Armstrongs at their yard in Barrow in 1943. She was named for Telemachus, a figure in Greek mythology; he was the son of Odysseus and Penelope, and an important character in Homer's Odyssey.

== Service ==
=== Second World War ===
Although briefly deployed in British waters, Telemachus served in the Far East for much of her wartime career under the command of Bill King, arriving there to serve with the Eastern Fleet at Colombo in July 1944. Later in the same month on 17 July whilst on her first patrol in Far Eastern waters, she sank the Japanese submarine I-166 off the One Fathom Bank in the Strait of Malacca.

Telemachus sighted the Japanese submarine at 07:08 hours, and fired six torpedoes twelve minutes later at a range of 2,300 yards (2,100 m). An explosion was heard 94 seconds later from a single torpedo hit. I-166's commanding officer and a handful of other crew survived the sinking. After this patrol, she transferred to the 8th Submarine Flotilla, based at Fremantle, Western Australia. In October 1944 Telemachus dropped intelligence operatives into Japanese held Johore as part of Operation Carpenter.

=== Post-war ===
She survived the war and continued in service with the Navy. It was arranged for Telemachus to be one of three submarines to be based out of Sydney, Australia, to assist in the Royal Australian Navy's (RAN) anti-submarine training, owing to the decision to acquire the aircraft carrier HMAS Sydney. She left Britain on 19 October 1949 and arrived in Sydney in December that year, the first of the three submarines of the 4th Flotilla to arrive (the others being Thorough and Tactician). She was refitted at Singapore in late 1950, and again in 1952–1953, after which she spent several months based in Japan providing anti-submarine training for ships taking part in the Korean War.

In May 1954 she conducted operations with the Australian warships HMAS Anzac and HMAS Vengeance, the New Zealand cruiser HMNZS Black Prince, and sister submarine HMS Thorough.

Between June and August 1956 she operated in conjunction with the RAN to conduct a hydrographic survey off the Australian Antarctic Territory. The cruise lasted some 7,500 miles (12,100 km), and involved the boat taking around 130 gravity measurements at depths of 50–200 feet (15–61 m). Whilst conducting these surveys, she went missing for two and a half hours on 3 June, resulting in an air and sea search being conducted until she resumed contact. After failing to report in as expected at 07:15, the naval authorities in Sydney issued the signal "submiss" an hour later. Ship's crews were ordered to return to their vessels, and the Thorough was the first to get underway to search for Telemachus. She again failed to report in as required at 09:45, but a Douglas C-47 Skytrain spotted the submarine before any other ships began to search for her, and the "submiss" order was cancelled.

She returned to British waters on 9 December 1959, following nearly ten years of service in conjunction with the Australian Navy. She was scrapped at Charlestown on 28 August 1961.
