= Leslie baronets =

Set index for Leslie baronets

There have been four baronetcies created for persons with the surname Leslie, one in the Baronetage of Nova Scotia, one in the Baronetage of Ireland, one in the Baronetage of Great Britain and one in the Baronetage of the United Kingdom. As of 2026 three of the creations are extant.

- Leslie baronets of Wardis and Findrassie (1625)
- Leslie, later Pepys baronets, of Juniper Hill (1784): see Earl of Cottenham
- Leslie baronets of Tarbert (1787): see Sir Edward Leslie, 1st Baronet (1744–1818)
- Leslie baronets of Glaslough (1876)
