= Leslie baronets of Wardis and Findrassie (1625) =

Escutcheon of the Leslie baronets of Wardis and Findrassie

The Leslie baronetcy, of Wardis and Findrassie in the County of Moray, was created in the Baronetage of Nova Scotia on 1 September 1625 for John Leslie, with remainder to his heirs male whatsoever. He was the son of John Leslie and his wife Jane Crichton, sister of James Crichton of Frendraught. He married Elspeth Gordon, daughter of John Gordon; after his death in 1640 she married, as his third wife, Sir Alexander Gordon, 1st Baronet of Cluny.

On the death of the 2nd Baronet in 1645, the title reverted to his uncle, William Leslie; he declined to assume the title as he would not also inherit the Wardis estate. His four sons all died childless.

The title was assumed in 1800 by John Leslie, the 4th Baronet, a descendant of Norman Leslie, younger brother of the 3rd Baronet. The title is currently marked "dormant" on the Official Roll.

== Leslie baronets, of Wardis and Findrassie (1625) ==
- Sir John Leslie, 1st Baronet (died 1640)
- Sir John Leslie, 2nd Baronet (died 1645)
- Sir William Leslie, 3rd Baronet (died c. 1680) (did not assume title – dormant)
- Sir John Leslie, 4th Baronet (c. 1750–1825) (assumed title c. 1800)
- Sir Charles Abraham Leslie, 5th Baronet (1796–1847)
- Sir Norman Robert Leslie, 6th Baronet (1822–1857)
- Sir Charles Henry Leslie, 7th Baronet (1848–1905)
- Sir Norman Roderick Alexander David Leslie, 8th Baronet (1889–1937)
- Sir (Henry John) Lindores Leslie, 9th Baronet (1920–1967)

The title became dormant on the death of the 9th Baronet.

== Extended family ==
The 1st Baronet was a descendant of the Leslies of Balquhain, from whom the Leslie Counts of the Holy Roman Empire are also descended.
