= Japanese submarine I-166 =

Imperial Japanese Navy Kaidai-class submarine of the KD5 sub-class

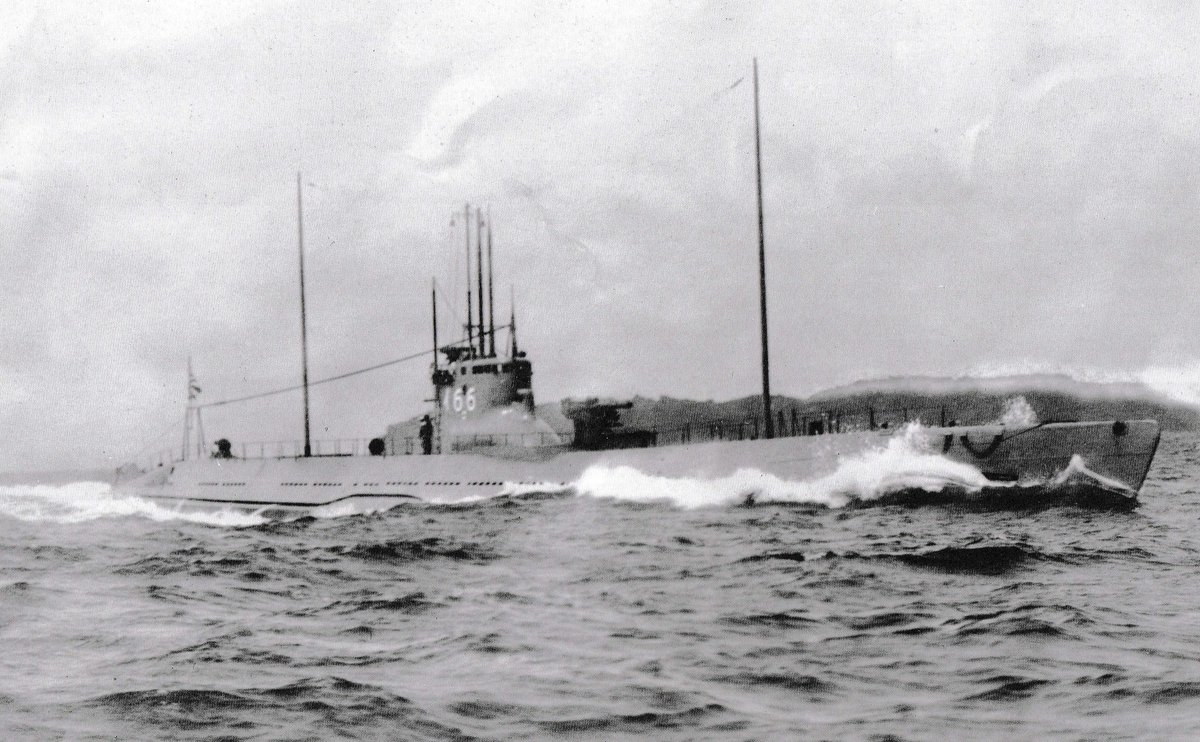
- I-166 on sea trials, 2 November 1932

History

Empire of Japan
- Name: I-66
- Builder: Sasebo Navy Yard, Sasebo, Japan
- Laid down: 8 November 1929
- Launched: 2 June 1931
- Completed: 10 November 1932
- Commissioned: 10 November 1932
- Decommissioned: 1 November 1934
- Recommissioned: 1 December 1936
- Decommissioned: 1 December 1937
- Recommissioned: 1 September 1939
- Renamed: I-166 on 20 May 1942
- Fate: Sunk, 17 July 1944
- Stricken: 10 September 1944

General characteristics
- Class & type: Kaidai-class submarine (KD5 Type)
- Displacement: 1,732 tonnes (1,705 long tons) surfaced; 2,367 tonnes (2,330 long tons) submerged
- Length: 97.7 m (320 ft 6 in)
- Beam: 8.2 m (26 ft 11 in)
- Draft: 4.7 m (15 ft 5 in)
- Installed power: 6,000 bhp (4,500 kW) (diesels); 1,800 hp (1,300 kW) (electric motors)
- Propulsion: Diesel-electric; 2 × diesel engines; 2 × electric motors
- Speed: 20 knots (37 km/h; 23 mph) surfaced; 8.25 knots (15.28 km/h; 9.49 mph) submerged
- Range: 10,800 nmi (20,000 km; 12,400 mi) at 10 knots (19 km/h; 12 mph) surfaced; 60 nmi (110 km; 69 mi) at 3 knots (5.6 km/h; 3.5 mph) submerged
- Test depth: 70 m (230 ft)
- Complement: 75
- Armament: 6 × 533 mm (21 in) torpedo tubes (4 bow, 2 stern); 1 × 120 mm (4.7 in) deck gun; 1 × 13.2 mm (0.52 in) anti-aircraft machinegun

I-66, later I-166, was a Kaidai-class cruiser submarine of the KD5 sub-class completed for the Imperial Japanese Navy in 1932. She served during World War II, supporting the Japanese invasion of Malaya and the invasion of Sarawak, taking part in the Battle of Midway, and conducting numerous war patrols in the Indian Ocean before being sunk in July 1944.

== Design and description ==
The submarines of the KD5 sub-class were improved versions of the preceding KD4 sub-class. They displaced 1,732 tonnes (1,705 long tons) surfaced and 2,367 tonnes (2,330 long tons) submerged. The submarines were 97.7 meters (320 ft 6 in) long, had a beam of 8.2 meters (26 ft 11 in) and a draft of 4.7 meters (15 ft 5 in). The boats had a diving depth of 75 m (246 ft)

For surface running, the boats were powered by two 3,400-brake-horsepower (2,535 kW) diesel engines, each driving one propeller shaft. When submerged each propeller was driven by a 900-horsepower (671 kW) electric motor. They could reach 20 knots (37 km/h; 23 mph) on the surface and 8 knots (15 km/h; 9.2 mph) underwater. On the surface, the KD5s had a range of 10,800 nautical miles (20,000 km; 12,400 mi) at 10 knots (19 km/h; 12 mph); submerged, they had a range of 60 nmi (110 km; 69 mi) at 3 knots (5.6 km/h; 3.5 mph).

The boats were armed with six internal 53.3 cm (21.0 in) torpedo tubes, four in the bow and two in the stern. They carried a total of 14 torpedoes. They were also armed with one 100 mm (3.9 in) deck gun for combat on the surface, as well as a 13.2 mm (0.52 in) anti-aircraft machinegun.

== Construction and commissioning ==
Built by the Sasebo Navy Yard at Sasebo, Japan, I-66 was laid down on 8 November 1929 and launched on 2 June 1931. She was completed and accepted into Imperial Japanese Navy service on 10 November 1932.

== Service history ==
=== Pre-World War II ===
Upon commissioning, I-66 was assigned to Submarine Division 30 in the Sasebo Naval District. She was decommissioned on 1 November 1934 and placed in reserve. Recommissioned on or about 1 December 1936, she was in active service for a year before again decommissioning on 1 December 1937 and going back into reserve. She again was recommissioned on or about 1 September 1939.

On 11 October 1940, I-66 took part along with 97 other Japanese warships and 527 Japanese naval aircraft in an Imperial Naval Review in Tokyo Bay. A little over a year later, early on the morning of 21 October 1941, she collided with the submarine I-7 in Saeki Bay during naval maneuvers. Both submarines suffered only light damage.

As the Imperial Japanese Navy began to deploy in preparation for the impending conflict in the Pacific, I-66 — which together with I-65 made up Submarine Division 30, a part of Submarine Squadron 5 — departed Sasebo on 26 November 1941 bound for Palau along with the rest of Submarine Squadron 5, namely I-65, the submarines of Submarine Division 29, and the squadron's flagship, the light cruiser Yura. While en route, the entire squadron was reassigned to the Southern Force on 28 November 1941 and accordingly was diverted to Samah on Hainan Island in China. I-66 and I-65 arrived at Samah on 2 December 1941.

=== World War II ===
==== First war patrol, sinking of K XVi ====
On 5 December 1941, I-66 departed Samah to begin what would become her first war patrol. When the Japanese invasion of Malaya began on 8 December 1941 — the first day of World War II in East Asia — I-66 was in the South China Sea off Trengganu, British Malaya, operating on a patrol line with the submarines I-57, I-58, I-62, and I-64. On 15 December 1941, I-66 and I-65 were detached from this duty to conduct a reconnaissance of the approaches to Kuching in support of the invasion of Sarawak in British North Borneo, which began on 16 December 1941. The two submarines received a warning that Allied submarines were operating off Kuching. While preparing to surface to recharge her batteries 60 nautical miles (110 km; 69 mi) northwest of Kuching on 24 December 1941, I-66 sighted the Royal Netherlands Navy submarine HNLMS K XVI, which had just previously sank the Japanese destroyer Sagiri, on the surface on her starboard bow at a range of 5,500 yards (5,030 m). After a submerged approach, I-66 fired a single torpedo at 10:28. It struck K XVI, which broke in two and sank at 02°26′N 109°49′E with the loss of her entire crew of 36 and avenging the fallen destroyer. On 4 October 2011, Australian divers located the wreck of K XVI, broken in half and at a depth of 50 metres (164 ft). I-66 is one of only three Japanese submarines to have confirmed a sinking of an enemy submarine during World War II, with the others including I-25 which sank the Russian submarine L-16, and I-176 which sank the American submarine USS Corvina.

Reassigned to Patrol Unit "B" on 25 December 1941, I-66 concluded her patrol by arriving at Cam Ranh Bay in Japanese-occupied French Indochina on 27 December 1941.

==== Second war patrol ====
As a unit of Patrol Group "B," I-66 was among submarines tasked with attacking Allied shipping in the Indian Ocean west of the 106th meridian east, operating from a new base at newly captured Penang in Japanese-occupied British Malaya. Accordingly, on 5 January 1942 I-66 departed Cam Ranh Bay to begin her second war patrol, during which she was to operate in the Indian Ocean south of Lombok Strait, in the Andaman Sea, and in the Bay of Bengal. She was in the Java Sea 10 nautical miles (19 km; 12 mi) southwest of Lombok Strait on 11 January 1942 when she torpedoed the 6,211-ton United States Army Transport USAT Liberty — which was en route from Tanjung Priok in the Netherlands East Indies with a cargo of rubber and explosives — at 04:15. Liberty was badly damaged and went dead in the water at 08°54′S 115°28′E. The United States Navy destroyer USS Paul Jones and the Dutch destroyer HNLMS Van Ghent attempted to tow Liberty to Singaraja on the north coast of Bali, but Liberty began taking on so much water that she had to be beached on the northeast coast of Bali off Tulamben, where she sat until the volcano Mount Agung erupted. The eruption and following tremors pushed the USAT Liberty into the ocean where she now rests. Between the depths of 3-28m, it is now one of the most famous and easily accessible wrecks in the world to scuba dive.>

At 15:16 on 21 January 1942, I-66 torpedoed the Panamanian 3,193-gross register ton merchant ship Nord — bound from Calcutta, India, to Rangoon, Burma, with a cargo of 2,500 tons of coal — in the Preparis North Channel in the Andaman Sea. Nord sank at 15°28′N 094°36′E without loss of life. On 22 January 1942, I-66 torpedoed the British 2,358-ton passenger-cargo steamer Chak Sang — which was proceeding in ballast from Madras, India, to Rangoon — in the Bay of Bengal southwest of Bassein, Burma, at 05:25. I-66 then surfaced and sank Chak Sang with gunfire at 15°42′N 095°02′E. Five of the 66-member crew of Chak Sang perished. I-66 completed her patrol with her arrival at Penang on 29 January 1942.

==== Third war patrol ====
During I-66′s stay at Penang, the commander of Submarine Division 30 transferred his flag to her. On 9 February 1942, she set out from Penang to begin her third war patrol, during which she was to patrol in the Indian Ocean off Ceylon. On 14 February 1942 at 08:17, while she was operating east of Trincomalee, Ceylon, she torpedoed the British 2,076-gross register ton Straits Steamship Company steamer Kamuning — which was carrying a cargo of rice from Rangoon to Colombo, Ceylon — at 08°35′N 081°44′E. She then surfaced and opened fire on Kamuning with her deck gun. Six of Kamuning′s 69-member crew were killed. The disabled steamer remained afloat, but while under tow to Trincomalee she sank at 08°35′N 081°26′E. I-66 returned to Penang on 2 March 1942.

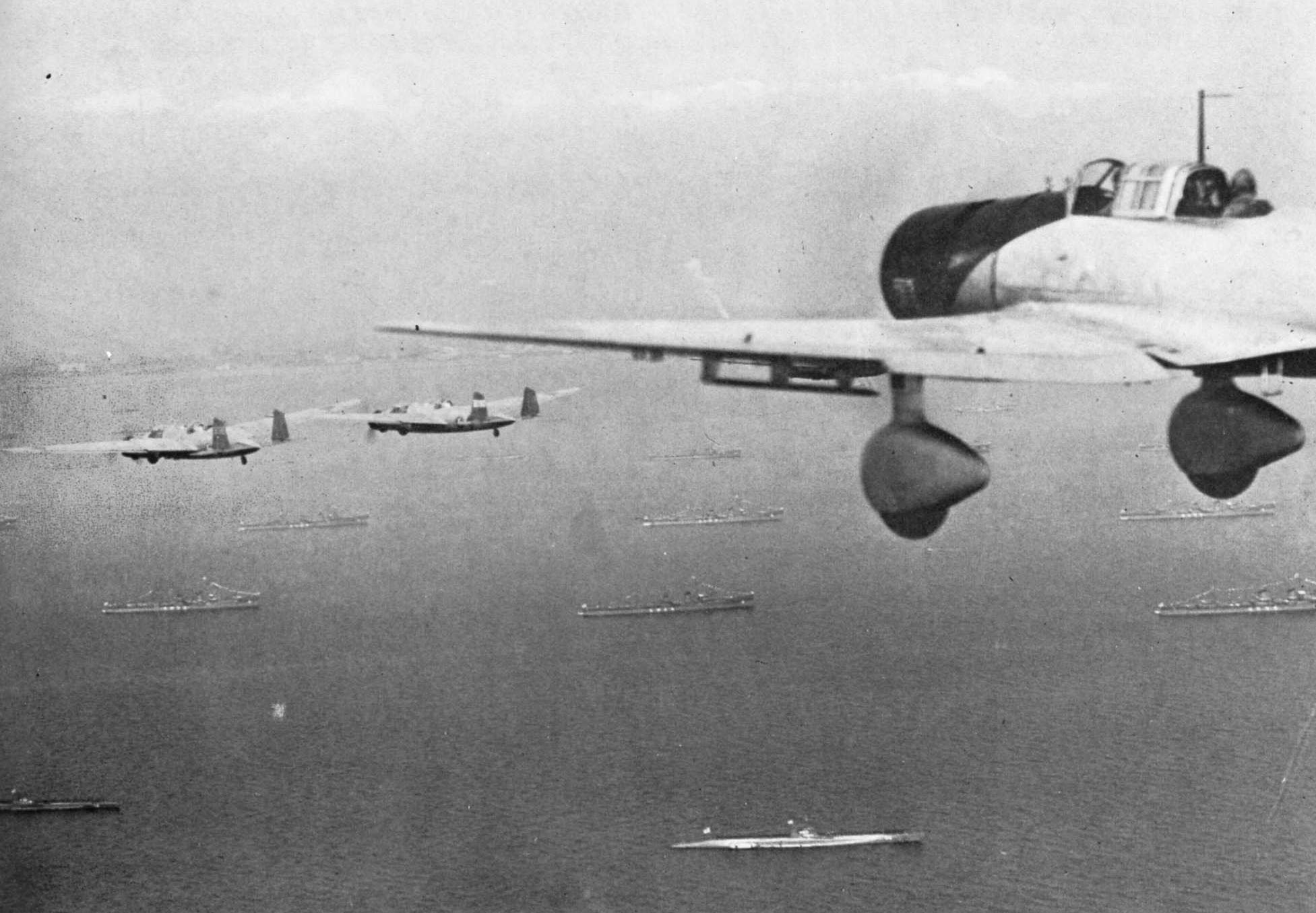
Japanese ships anchored off Yokohama for a fleet review, 11 October 1940. I-166 is in the closest row to the right of I-155.

==== March–May 1942 ====
On 15 March 1942, I-66 departed Penang for Sasebo, where she arrived on 28 March 1942. She departed Sasebo on 15 May 1942 bound for Kwajalein, deploying in support of Operation MI, the planned invasion of Midway Atoll. During her voyage, she was renumbered I-166 on 20 May 1942. She arrived at Kwajalein on 24 May 1942.

==== Fourth war patrol: The Battle of Midway ====
On 26 May 1942, I-166 departed Kwajalein for her fourth war patrol, operating in support of Operation MI, the planned Japanese invasion of Midway Atoll in the Northwestern Hawaiian Islands, in which Submarine Squadron 5 formed part of the Advance Expeditionary Force. She operated in a patrol line between 28°20′N 162°20′W and 26°00′N 165°00′W which also included the submarines I-156, I-157, I-158, I-159, I-162, and I-165. The Japanese suffered a decisive defeat on 4 June 1942 during the Battle of Midway, and that day the commander-in-chief of the 6th Fleet, Vice Admiral Teruhisa Komatsu, ordered the 15 submarines in the Japanese submarine patrol line to move westward.

After the commander-in-chief of the Combined Fleet, Admiral Isoroku Yamamoto, ordered Komatsu to interpose his submarines between the retreating Japanese fleet and the opposing United States Navy aircraft carriers, the Japanese submarines, including I-166, began a gradual movement to the north-northwest, moving at 3 knots (5.6 km/h; 3.5 mph) by day and 14 knots (26 km/h; 16 mph) after dark. I-166 made no contact with enemy forces during the battle, and her patrol concluded with her arrival at Sasebo on 26 June 1942.

==== June–August 1942 ====
I-166 underwent an overhaul while at Sasebo. During her stay, Submarine Squadron 5 was disbanded on 10 July 1942 and her division, Submarine Division 30, was reassigned to the Southwest Area Fleet. With her overhaul complete, she departed Sasebo on 22 July 1942 bound for Penang, where she arrived on 6 August 1942.

==== Fifth war patrol ====
I-166 began her fifth war patrol on 11 August 1942, departing Penang for an operating area in the Indian Ocean. During the patrol she reported sinking two Allied merchant ships, on 16 and 17 August 1942. She returned to Penang on 31 August 1942.

==== Sixth war patrol ====
On 18 September 1942, I-166 set out from Penang for her sixth war patrol, bound for an operating area in the Indian Ocean. She attacked an unidentified Allied merchant ship on 29 September 1942, but her torpedoes missed and the ship escaped. On 1 October 1942, she landed three Indian National Army agents on Ceylon. Later that day, she attacked the Panamanian 1,201-gross register ton armed merchant ship Camila with gunfire at 13:10 at 08°10′N 077°41′E. The attack set Camila on fire and she was beached, becoming a total loss. I-166 returned to Penang on 11 October 1942.

==== Seventh war patrol ====
I-166 departed Penang on 5 November 1942 to begin her seventh war patrol, again in the Indian Ocean. She attacked an unidentified Allied merchant ship in the Arabian Sea on 13 November 1942, but scored no hits, and the ship escaped. On 23 November 1942, while in the Arabian Sea south of Cape Comorin, India, she torpedoed the British 5,332-gross register ton armed merchant ship Cranfield, which was on a voyage from Calcutta to Suez, Egypt. Cranfield sank at 08°26′N 076°42′E with the loss of nine lives; there were 67 survivors. I-166 returned to Penang on 28 November 1942.

==== Eighth war patrol ====
On 5 December 1942, I-166 left Penang for her eighth war patrol, assigned an operating area in the Indian Ocean off the northwest coast of Australia. Soon after she left, she received orders to divert from her patrol to bombard Cocos Island. She shelled the island on 25 December 1942, but otherwise saw no action, and concluded her patrol by arriving at Surabaya, Java, on 27 December 1942.

==== January–July 1943 ====
I-166 soon departed Surabaya bound for Sasebo, where she arrived on 19 January 1943. She was drydocked there. With repairs and an overhaul complete, she departed Sasebo in early July 1943 and proceeded to Surabaya, which she reached in mid-July 1943.

==== Ninth and tenth war patrols ====
Not long after her arrival at Surabaya, I-166 embarked on her ninth war patrol, assigned an operating area in the Indian Ocean between Fremantle, Australia, and Lombok Strait. The patrol was uneventful and concluded with her arrival at Balikpapan, Borneo, on 10 September 1943. On 11 September 1943 she departed Balikpapan bound for Singapore, where she arrived on 13 September 1943. Reassigned to the Southwest Area Fleet, she got underway from Singapore on 23 September 1943 and arrived at Penang on 25 September 1943.

On 9 October 1943, I-166 departed Penang and, after refueling at Sabang on the northern coast of Sumatra, headed into the Indian Ocean for her tenth war patrol. In late October 1943 she attacked an unidentified Allied merchant ship off Colombo, Ceylon, but scored no hits. She returned to Penang on 13 November 1943.

==== Eleventh and twelfth war patrols ====
I-166 began her eleventh war patrol on 7 December 1943, getting underway from Penang for an operating area in the Indian Ocean. She diverted from her patrol duties on 24 December 1943 to participate in Operation YO by landing six Indian National Army agents — all Ceylonese natives — at Kirinda on the west coast of Ceylon. British counterintelligence had detected the operation, which ended in failure when all six agents were captured soon after coming ashore; all six later were executed. Meanwhile, I-166 proceeded to a patrol area in the vicinity of Eight Degree Channel. She made no attacks on shipping, and returned to Penang on 9 January 1944.

Departing Penang on 7 February 1944, I-166 conducted her twelfth war patrol in the Indian Ocean and Bay of Bengal. On 19 February 1944, she fired two torpedoes at the British 6,943-gross register ton armed tanker British Fusilier, but both missed and British Fusilier escaped. I-166 returned to Penang on 13 March 1944.

==== March–July 1944 ====
On 25 March 1944, I-166′s division, Submarine Division 3, was reassigned to Submarine Squadron 8. On 27 April 1944, she got underway to carry out a supply mission, Operation RI, and she returned to Penang on 1 June 1944. On the afternoon of 16 July 1944, she departed Penang to rendezvous with Vice Admiral Takeo Kurita′s First Diversion Attack Force at Lingga Roads so that she and the submarine I-37 could serve as antisubmarine warfare targets for Japanese destroyers during 2nd Fleet exercises.

==== Loss ====
On 17 July 1944, the Royal Navy submarine HMS Telemachus was on patrol at periscope depth in the Strait of Malacca 7 nautical miles (13 km; 8.1 mi) southeast of One Fathom Bank in limited visibility when at 07:08 she sighted I-166 heading toward her on the surface at a range of 4 nautical miles (7.4 km; 4.6 mi), bearing 325 degrees, and making an estimated 18 knots (33 km/h; 21 mph). Telemachus also established sound contact on I-166 shortly afterwards. At 0720, Telemachus fired six torpedoes at a range of 1,500 yards (1,370 m), Telemachus broaching briefly because the torpedoes were of a new, heavier type than Telemachus′s crew was accustomed to firing. After 92 seconds, one torpedo hit I-166's stern, causing a violent explosion. I-166 sank in 130 feet (40 m) of water at 02°48′N 101°03′E. 10 members of her crew were blown overboard and survived. The other 88 men on board were killed.

The Japanese 15th Special Base Unit at Penang sent the minelayer Wa-4 and two torpedo boats, assisted by an Imperial Japanese Army Air Force Mitsubishi Ki-21 (Allied reporting name "Sally") heavy bomber, to find and sink Telemachus. Wa-4 dropped 12 depth charges and the Ki-21 dropped two 60-kilogram (132 lb) general-purpose bombs, but Telemachus escaped without damage.

On 10 September 1944, I-166 was stricken from the Navy List.

== Summary of raiding history ==
Date	Ship name	Classification	Tonnage	Nationality	Fate
25 December 1941	K XVI	Submarine	865	Dutch	Sunk
11 January 1942	Liberty	Army transport ship	6,211	USA	Sunk
21 January 1942	Nord	Merchant Ship	3,193	Panama	Sunk
22 January 1942	Chak Sang	Cargo Steamer	2,358	Britain	Sunk
14 February 1942	Kamuning	Steamship	2,076	Britain	Sunk
1 October 1942	Camila	Armed Merchant Ship	1,201	Panama	Destroyed
22 November 1942	Cranfield	Armed Merchant Ship	5,332	Britain	Sunk
