= Leonard Jerome =

American financier and maternal grandfather of Winston Churchill

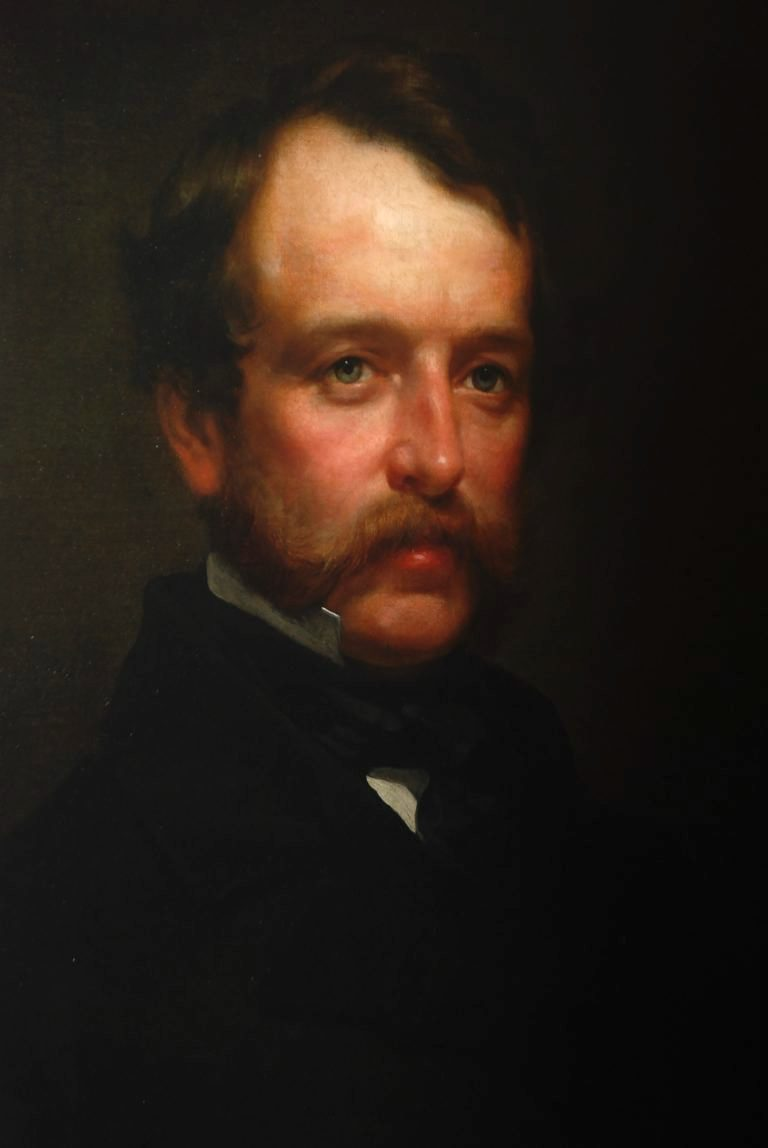
- Born: Leonard Walter Jerome; November 3, 1817; Pompey, New York, U.S.
- Died: March 3, 1891 (aged 73); Brighton, East Sussex, England
- Education: Princeton University; Union College
- Spouse: Clarissa Hall (m. 1849)
- Children: 4, including Lady Randolph Churchill
- Relatives: Winston Churchill (grandson)

Leonard Walter Jerome (November 3, 1817 – March 3, 1891) was an American financier in Brooklyn, New York, and the maternal grandfather of Winston Churchill.

== Early life ==
Leonard Jerome was born in Pompey in Onondaga County, New York, on November 3, 1817. He was one of nine sons and one daughter born to Aurora (née Murray) Jerome (1785–1867) and Isaac Jerome (1786–1866). Isaac was a descendant of Timothy Jerome, a French Huguenot immigrant who arrived in the New York Colony in 1717. Jerome was born on a farm in the central New York town of Pompey, near Syracuse. His paternal grandmother was Betsy Ball, a relative of George Washington. His maternal ancestry was Scottish.

He originally enrolled in Princeton University, then known as the College of New Jersey (where two of his brothers studied theology and became Presbyterian ministers), as a member of the Class of 1839, before leaving for Union College, where he studied law with his uncle, known as Judge Jerome, and set up a practice in Rochester, New York. He later moved to New York City, where he became a stock speculator and promoter.

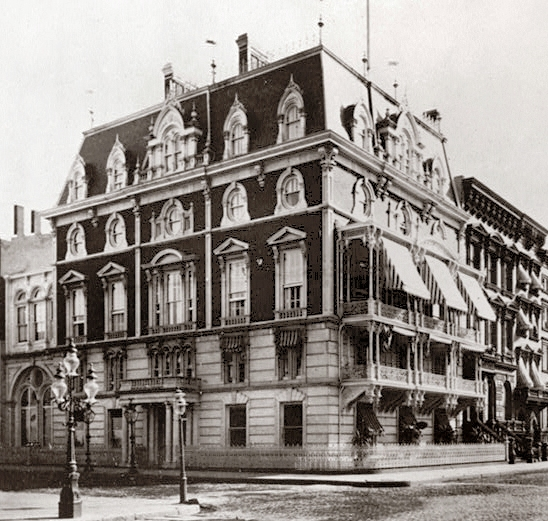
The Jerome Mansion at 26th Street and Madison Avenue, c.1878

== Career ==
Jerome was a flamboyant and successful stock speculator. He made and lost several fortunes, and was known as "The King of Wall Street". He held interests in several railroad companies and was often a partner in the deals of Cornelius Vanderbilt. He was a patron of the arts, and joined in the founding of the Academy of Music, one of New York City's earliest opera houses.

During the New York Draft Riots, Jerome defended the New York Times office building with a Gatling Gun. Although he had significant holdings in the Times, he was not the majority shareholder as is sometimes erroneously claimed.

The Jerome Mansion, on the corner of Madison Avenue and 26th Street, had a six-hundred-seat theatre, a breakfast room which seated seventy people, a ballroom of white and gold with champagne- and cologne-spouting fountains, and a view of Madison Square Park. It was later sold and housed a series of private clubs. The mansion was demolished in 1967.

=== Sporting activities ===
Jerome was an avid sportsman. He enjoyed yachting with his friend, William K. Vanderbilt. They shared a passion for thoroughbred horse racing and helped found the American Jockey Club.

In the late 1860s, Jerome was part of several hunting trips in the American West. These trips were guided by Buffalo Bill Cody.

In 1866, Jerome bought the estate and mansion of James Bathgate near Old Fordham Village in what was then rural Westchester County, but is now The Bronx. Jerome and financier August Belmont, Sr. built Jerome Park Racetrack on the Bathgate land; the first Belmont Stakes was held there in 1867. Jerome and his brother Lawrence had a wide boulevard made from Macombs Dam to the track, which city authorities attempted to name "Murphy Avenue" after a local politician. This incensed Jerome's wife so much that she had bronze plaques saying "Jerome Avenue" made up and bolted into place along the road, forcing the city to accept the name. The racetrack was acquired and demolished by the city in 1894, to make way for Jerome Park Reservoir. The Bathgate mansion served as a summer home for the Jerome family. In the early 1900s, the mansion was razed and replaced by the Kingsbridge Armory.

Jerome became a resident of Brooklyn. He, Vanderbilt, and other investors founded the Coney Island Jockey Club which in 1884 built the Sheepshead Bay Race Track.

== Personal life ==
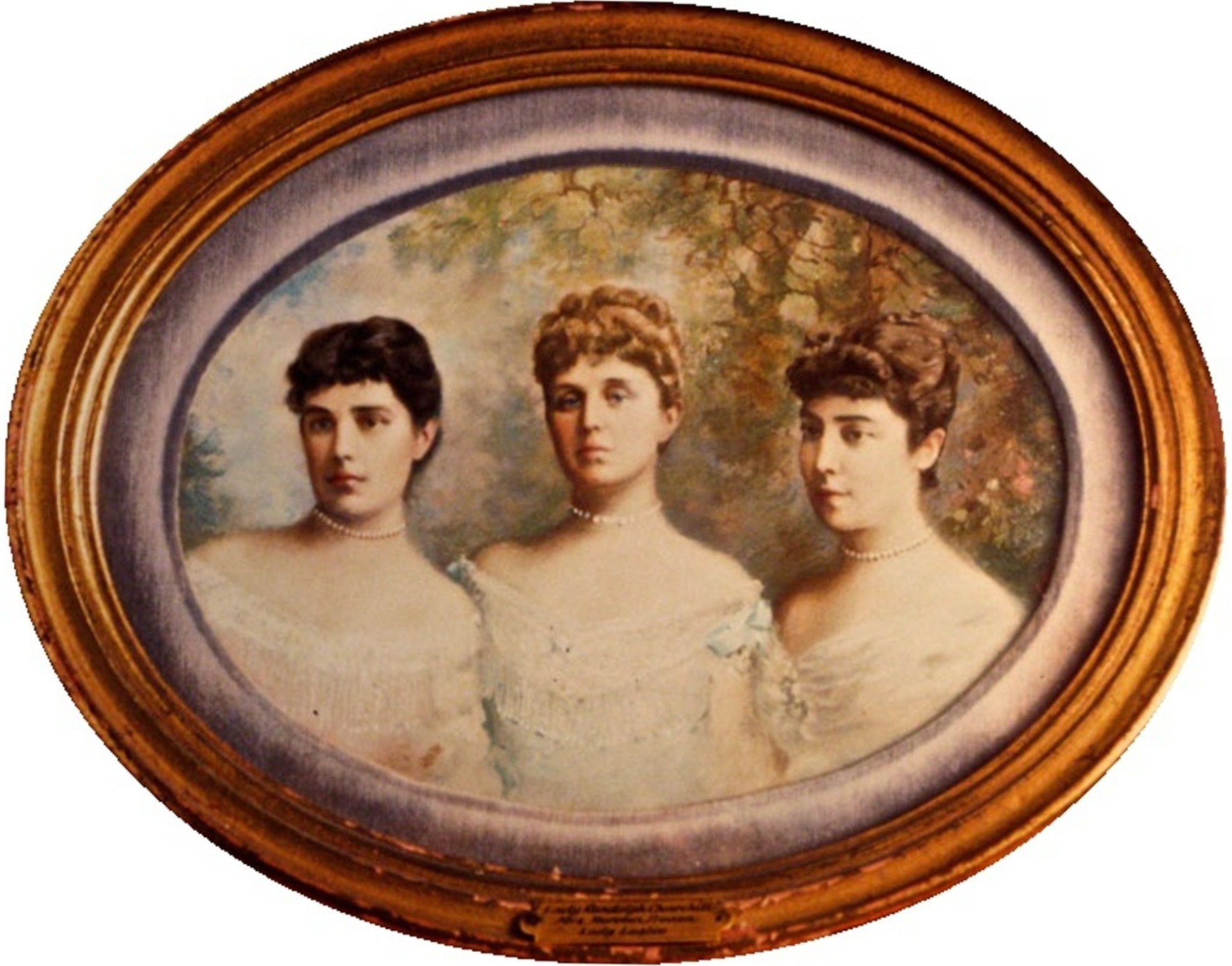
Jerome's daughters: Jennie (1854–1921), Clara (1851–1935) and Leonie (1859–1943)

On April 5, 1849, Jerome married Clarissa Hall (1825–1895), daughter of the wealthy Amos Hall, in Palmyra, New York. Together, they had four daughters. One daughter, Camille, died at age eight. The other three – Jeanette, Clarita, and Leonie – became known, in some quarters, as "the Good, the Witty and the Beautiful". Leonard Jerome's wealth afforded his daughters the opportunity to spend much time in Europe, where they associated with the aristocratic elite of the day. All three daughters married British or Anglo-Irish husbands:

- Lady Randolph Churchill (née Jeanette Jerome; known as Jennie), who married Lord Randolph Churchill (1849–1895), younger son of the Duke of Marlborough, and was mother to Winston Churchill and John Strange Spencer-Churchill.
- Clarita Frewen (née Clarita Jerome), known as Clara, who married Moreton Frewen (1853–1924), fifth son of Thomas Frewen MP, a charming spendthrift who ran up huge debts trying to operate a ranch in Wyoming, and through gambling, sports, and women. They had two sons, Hugh and Oswald, and one daughter, Clare Sheridan.
- Leonie, Lady Leslie (née Leonie Jerome), who married Sir John Leslie (1857–1944), an Irish baronet, whose family estates covered 70,000 acres (280 km^{2}). They had four sons.

Jerome was also rumored to be the father of the American opera singer Minnie Hauk. He also had an affair in the 1860s with Fanny Ronalds, then separated from her husband. Ronalds later lived in London, where she remained a friend of Jerome's daughter Jennie.

Leonard Jerome died at the age of 73 in Brighton, England, surrounded by his wife and surviving daughters. He was originally buried at Kensal Green Cemetery in England, and later buried in the Green-Wood Cemetery in Brooklyn.

== Legacy ==
Jerome Avenue in the Bronx, Jerome Avenue in Brooklyn, Jerome Park Reservoir, and the Jerome Stakes are all named after him.

In 2023 Jerome was posthumously inducted into the National Museum of Racing and Hall of Fame as a Pillar of the Turf for his contributions to thoroughbred racing.
