= Oranmore Castle =

Tower house in County Galway, Ireland

- Caisleán Órán Mór (Irish)
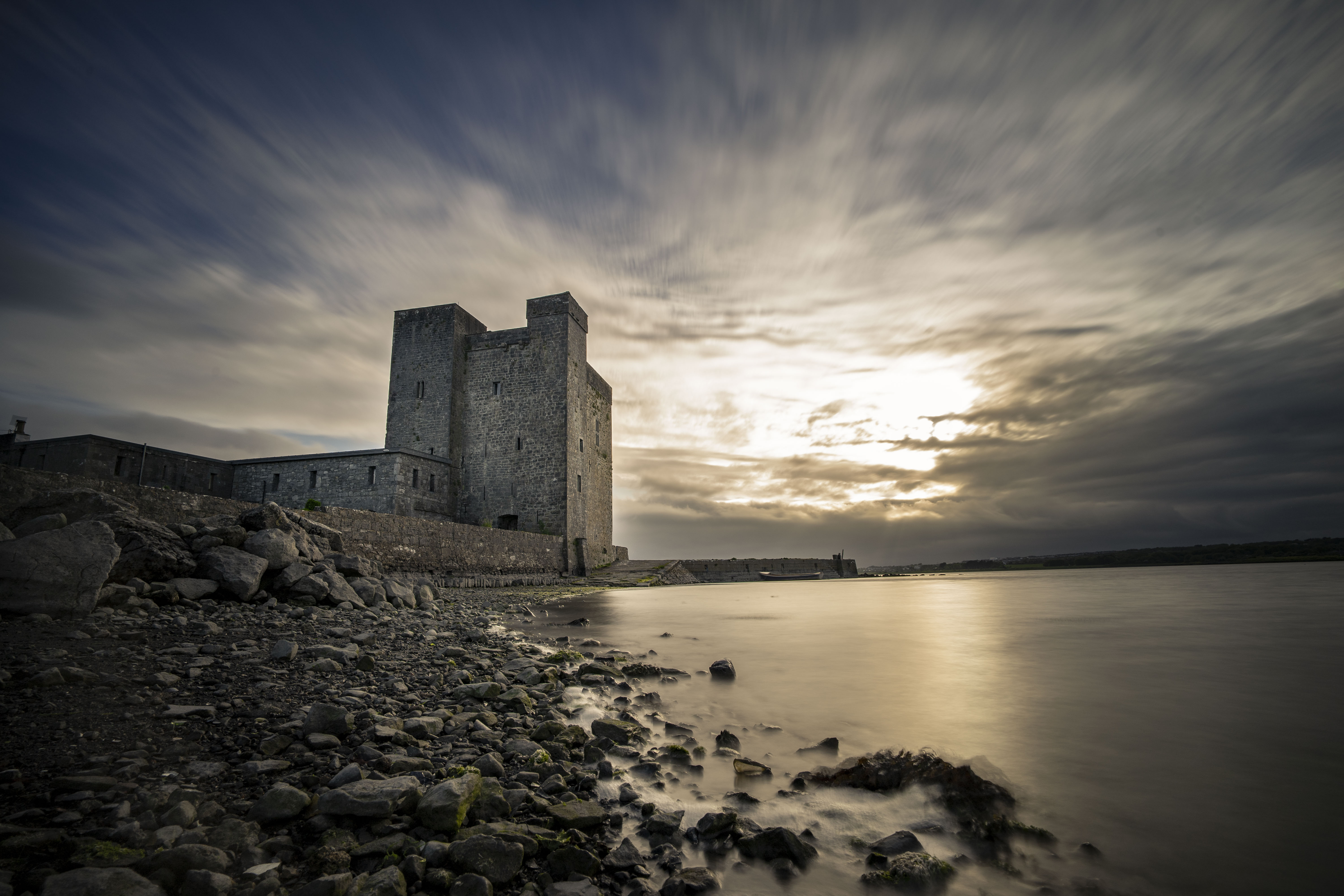

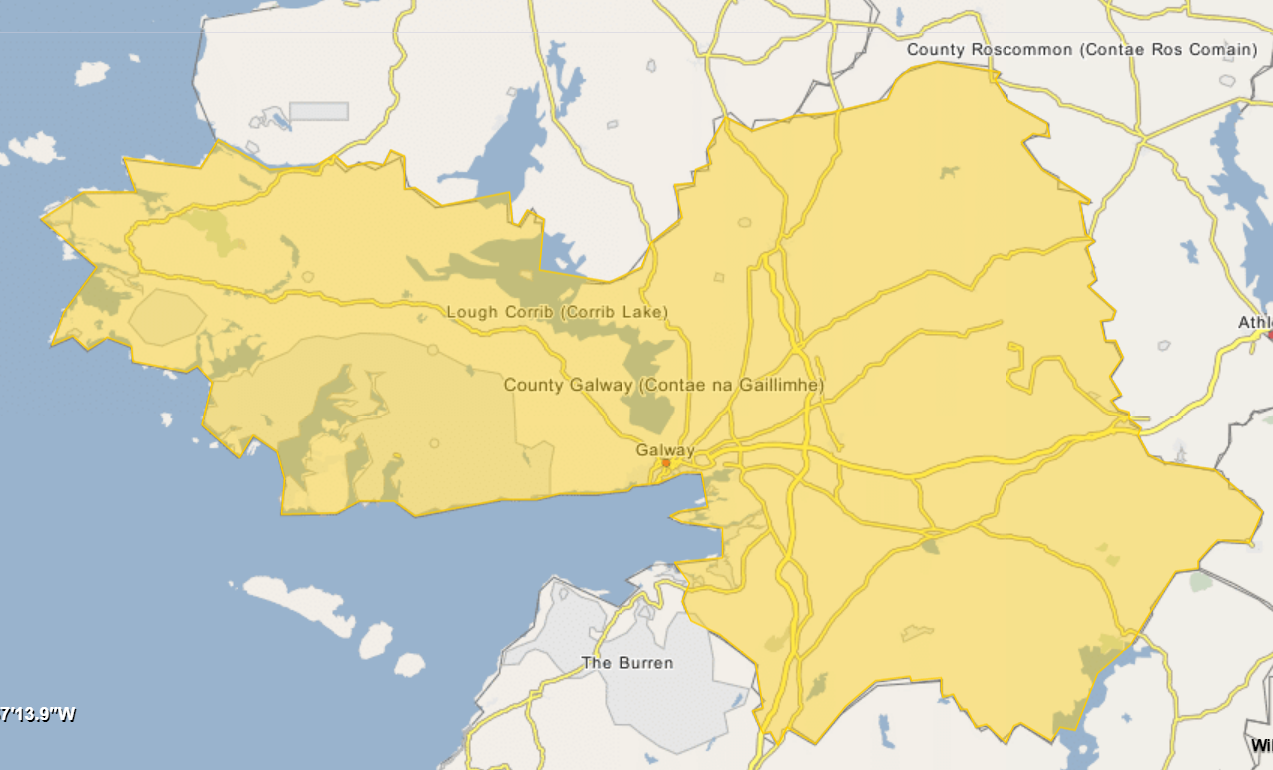
- Location within County Galway Location within Ireland
- 53°16′5.72″N 8°56′6.25″W
- Type: tower house
- Location: Oranmore, County Galway, Ireland

History
- Built: 15th century

Site notes
- Owner: Leonie Finn

Oranmore Castle is a castle in Oranmore, County Galway, Ireland.

== History ==
Oranmore Castle was most likely built some time around the 15th century, possibly on top of an older fortified house. The Clanricardes, a notable family from Galway, used it as a stronghold. In March 1642 the town, Oranmore, joined Confederate Ireland in a rebellion, against which the owners of the castle, the Marquess and the fifth Earl Clanricarde, held out. Clanricarde supplied the Fort of Galway from the sea until 1643, when, without the Marquess's sanction, Captain Willoughby Governor of Galway surrendered.

While ownership was temporarily lost, the 6th Earl regained possession, and in 1666 leased the castle to Walter Athy, whose descendants kept control of Oranmore until 1853. It was then abandoned.

The castle, which had fallen into disrepair, was reroofed after Anita Leslie purchased it in 1947 for £200. Her daughter Leonie inherited the castle upon Anita's death. Leonie and her husband, Irish folk musician Alec Finn (1944-2018), lived there from that time.

== Structure and layout ==
The castle, a rectangular towerhouse, has four storeys, a square staircase turret, and gunloops on the bottom floor.

== Popular culture ==
Oranmore Castle was featured in the 23 March 2001 episode of Scariest Places on Earth. It was also used for the shooting of Alfred the Great, as well as a film location for the Jack Taylor film The Pikeman. The exterior of Oranmore Castle is seen in the TV series Reign, as a French donjon.
