= Desmond Leslie =

British pilot, film maker, writer, and musician (1921–2001)

Desmond Arthur Peter Leslie (29 June 1921 – 21 February 2001) was an Irish pilot, film maker, writer, and musician. He was a Spitfire pilot in the RAF during World War II, became one of the first pioneers of electronic music, and co-wrote one of the first books on UFOs, Flying Saucers Have Landed (1953), with writer and UFO contactee George Adamski. In 1962 he punched theatre critic Bernard Levin during a live broadcast of the TV show That Was The Week That Was

== Early life ==
Desmond Arthur Peter Leslie was born on 29 June 1921 in London, the youngest child of Marjorie (née Ide) and Shane Leslie (a first cousin of Sir Winston Churchill). His older brother was Sir John Leslie, 4th Baronet. He served as a Spitfire pilot in the RAF during World War II.

== Writer ==
Desmond Leslie published several books, including the subject of UFOs—the first of which, Flying Saucers Have Landed, was co-written with George Adamski. He also wrote a series of satirical books ranging from The Jesus File, dealing with the crucifixion of Christ as recorded through the paper-work and internal correspondences of the Roman Garrison, to How Britain Won The Space Race, which he co-wrote with celebrated amateur astronomer Patrick Moore.

== Screenwriting/directing career ==
Desmond Leslie was briefly a screenwriter/director for film and television.

- My Hands Are Clay (1947)
- Stranger at My Door (1950)
- Stranger from Venus (1954)
- Them in the Thing (1960) (home movie)

Due to financial difficulties during the production of Stranger at My Door, Leslie opted to compose the music for the film himself. In the early 1950s, he designed the world's first effective multi-track sound mixing desk which he had built by Rupert Neve. It can still be seen in his family home Castle Leslie, Monaghan, where it has been an object of reverence for visitors such as Mick Jagger and Paul McCartney.

In 1962, Leslie punched theatre critic Bernard Levin during a live broadcast of the TV show That Was The Week That Was. Ostensibly this was to protect the honour of his then-wife, Agnes Bernelle, in response to Levin's critical review of her show, Savagery and Delight. Bernelle stated in her autobiography, The Fun Palace, that Savagery and Delight was poorly received due to Leslie's custom-built loudspeakers being moved below the stage, and that he had failed to check the situation, missing the show for a social appointment. As a consequence, no one behind the front two rows heard a word she sang.

== Electronic music career ==
During the late 1950s, he began nurturing his interest in contemporary music. In his small home studio, he experimented with the sounds of musique concrète. In January 1960, Leslie pressed a single acetate called Music of the Future (also known as Music Concrete [sic], because of the prominent text on the front of the sleeve, with the actual title appearing only on the back along with the track listings). The album includes music composed for Barry Shawzin’s short film The Day the Sky Fell In (1959).

All Leslie recordings were later licensed to Joseph Weinburger, and Leslie's recordings were pressed onto a short series of 78 rpm library discs, occasionally being put to use in science and mystery based programing, such as early Doctor Who episodes. He used a great number of tape sources to create his pieces; some sources he mentions in his liner notes are motor horns, humming tops and bells.

In 2005, Jonny Trunk's British record label, Trunk Records, re-released Desmond's 1960 acetate, never before released commercially. The sounds on this release were mastered from the original acetate. The recordings are believed to have been made between 1955 and 1959, and included are Desmond's original sleevenotes, containing information pertaining to each selection.

== Marriages and children ==
His first wife was Agnes Elizabeth Bernauer (Agnes Bernelle) on 18 August 1945. That marriage ended in divorce in 1969. The couple had two sons and one daughter:

- Shaun Rudolf Christopher Leslie (b. 4 June 1947), married Charlotte Bing; no offspring. He will likely inherit the Leslie Baronetcy, of Glaslough, County Monaghan, that his uncle, John Leslie, held until his death in 2016. Shaun Leslie is anticipated to be recognised as the 5th Baronet once he makes a formal application to be included on the Official Roll. As of 1 January 2022 the Baronetcy is regarded as 'Vacant'
- Christopher Mark Leslie (7 December 1952 – 24 July 2026)
- Antonia Kelvey Oriel Leslie (b. 1 November 1963)

He remarried, to Jennifer Helen Strong, in 1970; they had two daughters:

- Samantha Helen Leslie (b. 1966)
- Camilla Patricia Leslie (b. 29 March 1969)

== Last years and death ==
During the 1990s he devoted his time to restoring the aging family home of Castle Leslie which eventually opened to the public. He later relocated to Nice, France. He died from emphysema in Antibes on 21 February 2001, aged 79.

== Sources ==
- Yockel, Michael (11 April 2001). "They Came from Out of the Sky". New York Press (Volume 14, Issue 15). Archived from the original on 13 October 2007.
- Desmond Leslie: The Biography of an Irish Gentleman 1921–2001; O'Bryne, Robert; Lilliput Press, Dublin 2012 ISBN 1843511630
- The Flying Saucerers: A Social History of UFOlogy; Clarke, David and Roberts, Andy; Alternative Albion 2007 ISBN 1905646003
- Desmond Leslie: Obituary; The Telegraph 20 March 2001
