= Glaslough =

Village in County Monaghan, Ireland

Glaslough Glasloch
- Village
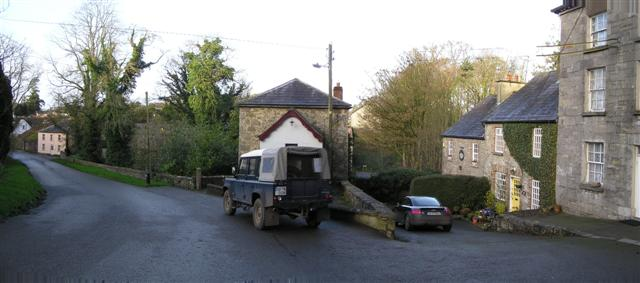
- Glaslough village

- Location in Ireland
- Coordinates: 54°19′N 6°54′W
- Country: Ireland
- Province: Ulster
- County: Monaghan

Population (2016)
  - Total: 453

Glaslough (/ɡlæsˈlɒx/ glas-LOKH; Irish: Glasloch, meaning 'green lake') is a village and townland in the north of County Monaghan, Ireland, on the R185 regional road 3 km (2 mi) south of the border with Northern Ireland and 10 km (6 mi) northeast of Monaghan town. Glaslough won the Irish Tidy Towns Competition in 1978 and again in 2019.

== Amenities ==
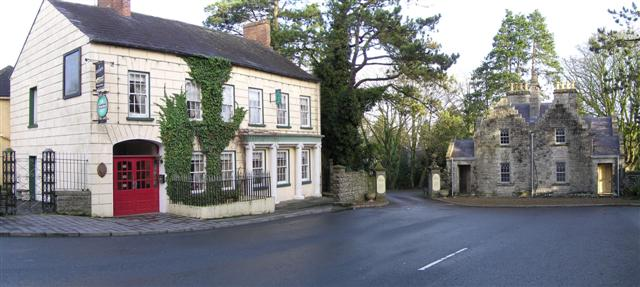
The village

Castle Leslie, a large Victorian country house and luxury hotel, is located on the edge of the village.

There is a playground and tennis court located on the main village green. There is also a shop and café in the village. Glaslough's local football (soccer) club is Glaslough Villa F.C.

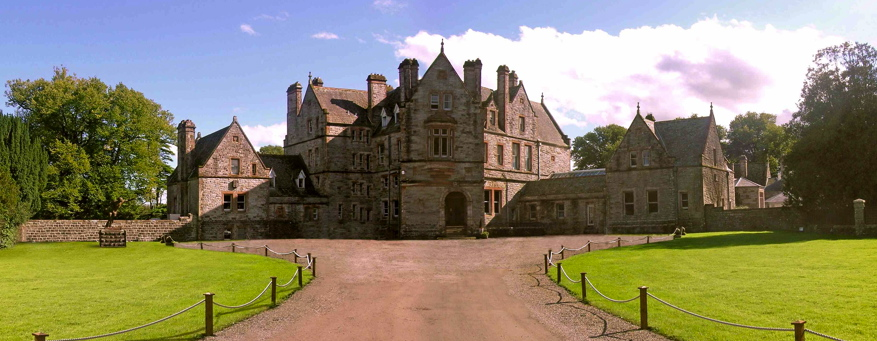
Castle Leslie

== Railways ==
The village was previously served by Glaslough railway station, which was part of the Ulster Railway; the station opened on 25 May 1858. The Ulster Railway merged with the Irish North Western Railway (INW) and the Northern Railway of Ireland in 1876, to form the Great Northern Railway (GNR).

The partition of Ireland in 1922 turned the boundary with County Armagh into an international frontier, after which trains were routinely delayed by customs inspections. In 1957, the Government of Northern Ireland made the GNR board close the line between Portadown and the border, giving the board no option but to withdraw passenger services between the border and Clones as well. CIÉ took over the remaining section of line between Clones, Monaghan and Glaslough in 1958, but withdrew goods services between Monaghan and Glaslough in 1959 and between Clones and Monaghan in 1960, leaving County Monaghan with no railway service.

== People ==
- John McKenna, first manager and later chairman of Liverpool F.C.
- Charlene McKenna, actress.
- Charles Leslie (1650-1722), nonjuring Church of Ireland priest, who became a Jacobite propagandist and helped publicise the 1692 Massacre of Glencoe.
- John Leslie, Scottish-born Church of Ireland Bishop, Royalist military commander during the English Civil War, and first member of the Leslie family to live in Glaslough.
- Jamie Duffy(born in 2001),Irish pianist known for his breakout piece Solas.

== See also ==
- List of towns and villages in the Republic of Ireland
