= Oranmore =

Town in County Galway, Ireland

Oranmore Órán Mór (Irish)
- Town
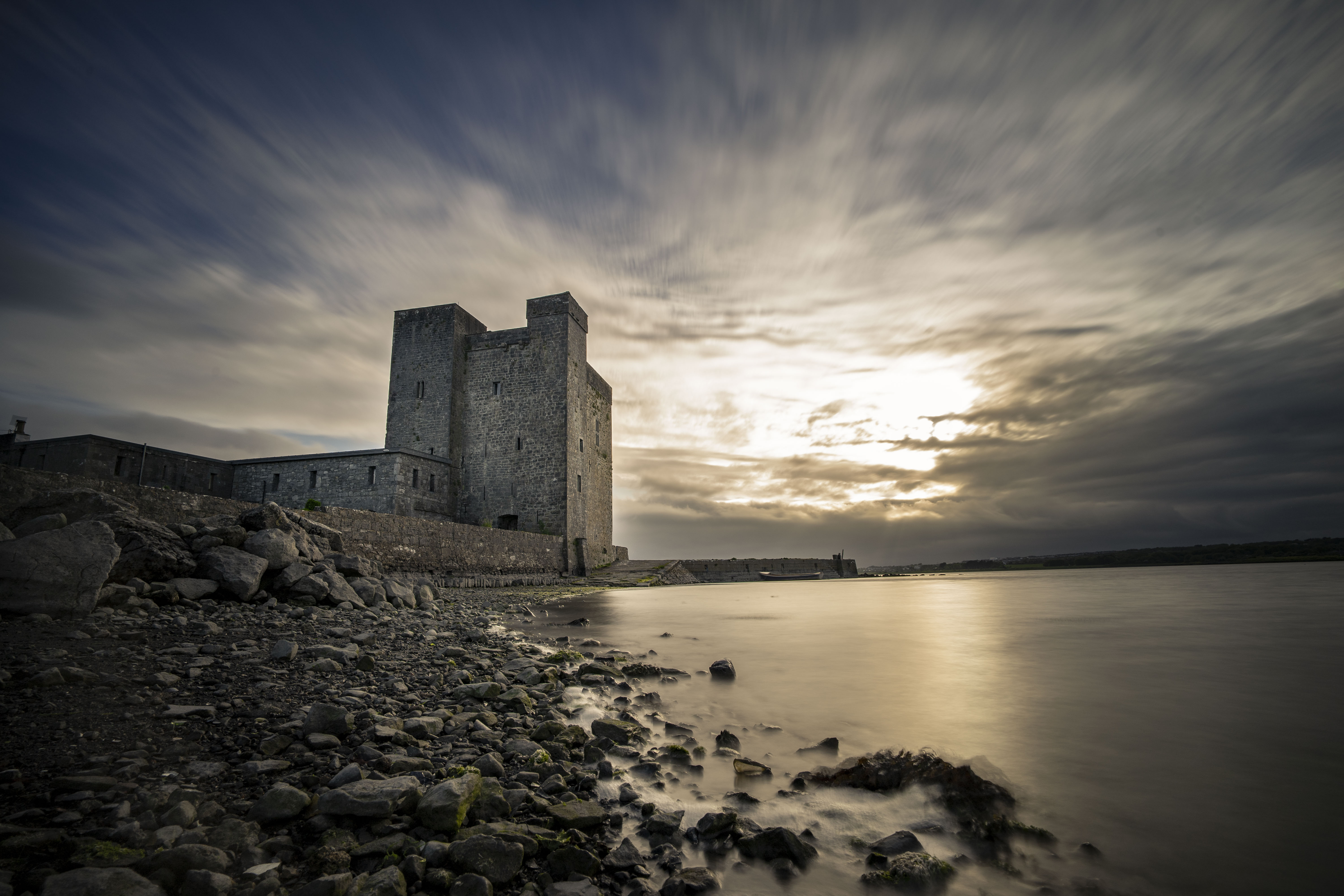
- Oranmore Castle

- Location in Ireland
- Coordinates: 53°16′06″N 8°55′12″W
- Country: Ireland
- Province: Connacht
- County: County Galway
- Elevation: 7 m (23 ft)

Population (2022)
  - Total: 5,819
- Time zone: UTC+0 (WET)
  - Summer (DST): UTC-1 (IST (WEST))
- Irish Grid Reference: M386245

Oranmore (Irish: Órán Mór or Uarán Mór) is a town in County Galway, Ireland, 9 km (5.6 mi) east of Galway city on an inlet of Galway Bay. At the 2022 census, Oranmore had a population of 5,819. The town is in a civil parish of the same name.

== Etymology ==
Oranmore is the anglicisation of Uarán Mór or Órán Mór. The first written record of Oranmore is in the Annals of the Four Masters. It was originally called Fuarán Mór, meaning "great spring" in Irish. This name reputedly refers to a spring or well near the village.

== History ==
=== Pre-history ===
Evidence of prehistoric settlement in the Oranmore Parish area include a number of fulacht fiadh (at Frenchfort townland), ringforts (Rinn townland) and a megalithic structure (at Garraun South townland). Griffith's Valuation, a land survey completed in 1857, shows several such structures (sometimes colloquially and collectively known as fairy forts) in the area.

=== Medieval church ruins ===
The ruins of a medieval Roman Catholic church is one of the oldest buildings in Oranmore town. Its northern wall forms part of the enclosure which encompasses the church and its graveyard. The church is believed to date to the 13th century. If true, this means it was built no later than one and a half century's after the initial Anglo-Norman Invasion of 1169 AD.

The existing remains measure approximately 32 feet by 72 feet, however, there is evidence that the church was larger at one time. Some grave markers in the adjoining cemetery have no discernible name or date. Other graves have been marked with pieces of the fallen church walls. The oldest gravestone, with a discernible date inscription, is a Celtic cross dated 1661. It is no longer in its original location but is instead lying on top of another, newer stone slab.

There is a gated section within the graveyard set aside for the Presentation Sisters, an order of teaching sisters who established a convent in Oranmore in 1861. Some interments occurred within the ruined walls of the actual church.

=== Oranmore Castle ===
Oranmore Castle is a tower house which was originally associated with the Norman Clanricarde family. It was built around the 15th century, reputedly on the site of an earlier structure.

=== St Mary's church ===
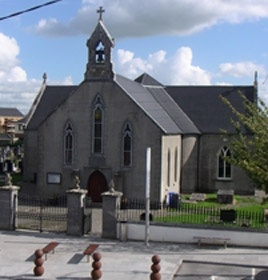
Oranmore's public library is in the deconsecrated St Mary's Church building

Completed in 1803, St Mary's is a large church building with a bell-cote above the front door and an elaborate ceiling. In 1972, it was replaced as the local parish church with the newer, larger Church of the Immaculate Conception. St Mary's was deconsecrated and converted to become the town's public library. Its carved baptismal font was moved to the new church, but the graveyard was left intact.

== Economy ==
The focus of industry has shifted from dairy agriculture to tourism, manufacturing and logistics.

== Transport ==
Oranmore town is near the old N6 Galway to Dublin road and the old N18 from Galway to Limerick. The M6 Motorway connects to the existing road at Doughiska, as well as connecting with the M18 at Glenascaul. The former N6 leading into Oranmore has been reclassified as the R338 regional road. The M18 motorway was officially opened on 27 September 2017 and connects to the M6 at Rathmorrissey at a three-level interchange. This road runs close to Oranmore but does not connect directly to it, and instead, motorists have to access it using the R381 at Kiltiernan or the M6 at Rathmorrissey.

Bus Éireann, Citylink, and Nestor Bus services through Oranmore serve Galway, Dublin, Cork, and Dublin and Shannon Airports. Also, Local Link buses serve other local places.

Oranmore Aerodrome was a Royal Air Force base in World War I. It later became a civil airfield serving the city of Galway.

=== Rail ===
Oranmore railway station opened on 1 August 1851 and closed on 17 June 1963. A new station was built 1.4 km west of the original station and was opened on 28 July 2013. Trains connect directly with Galway, Athenry, Athlone, Portarlington, Kildare and Dublin Heuston, as well as on the Western Rail Corridor to Ennis and Limerick.

== Education ==
Oranmore has two primary schools, Scoil Iosa and Gaelscoil de hÍde. Calasanctius College, founded in 1861 by the Presentation Sisters, is the secondary school in Oranmore.

== Sport ==
Oranmore-Maree GAA is the local GAA club and has won a number of county titles across several age groups, including a Galway Senior Hurling Championship title in 1933 and All-Ireland Intermediate Club Hurling Championship title in 2019. The club fields teams in Gaelic football, hurling and camogie. Naomh Mhuire Ladies Football Club (Oranmore Maree) fields ladies' Gaelic football teams from under-10 to minor and junior.

Maree/Oranmore Soccer Club was founded in 1989. The club reached the Connacht Cup Final in 2024 and finished in the top 3 of the Galway FA Men's Premier Division in 2023. The club also won four Galway FA U21 Premier League titles between 2021 and 2024.

Galway Bay Golf Resort is located in Renvile, Oranmore, and has been named the best golf resort in Connacht 10 times. Other clubs in the area include the Oranmore Badminton Club, Maree Badminton Club, Maree Basketball Club, Oranmore Judo Club and Galway Bay Sailing Club. The latter is based in Renville, Oranmore. Junior "Park Run" events are run on Sunday mornings.

== In popular culture ==
Oranmore is the setting for the popular Irish folk song "The Galway Shawl".

== People ==
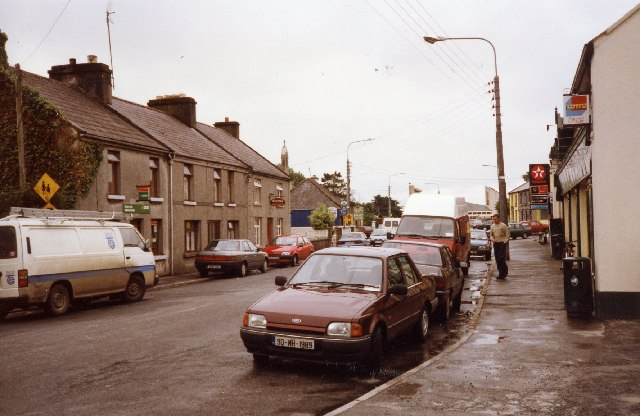
Oranmore in the 1990s

- Bundee Aki, rugby player with the Ireland national rugby union team, lives in the area.
- Joseph Henry Blake, nobleman and socialist, grew up on a nearby estate in Treanlaur, Maree
- Niall Burke, Galway hurler
- Aaron Connolly, professional Premier League footballer
- Nicola Coughlan, Irish actress who had roles in Derry Girls and Bridgerton
- Joe Howley, a member of the Irish Volunteers who was killed in 1920 during the Irish War of Independence, is commemorated by a statue in Oranmore.
- Bill King, round-the-world sailor and owner of Oranmore Castle.
- Célestin Lainé, leader of the Bezen Perrot SS unit, lived in Oranmore after World War II.
- Hildegarde Naughton, politician
- Thomas Nicholas Redington, Irish politician, born here.

== See also ==
- List of towns and villages in Ireland
