= Castle Leslie =

Castellated house in County Monaghan, Ireland

Coordinates: 54.3202°N 6.8903°W

Castle Leslie Estate
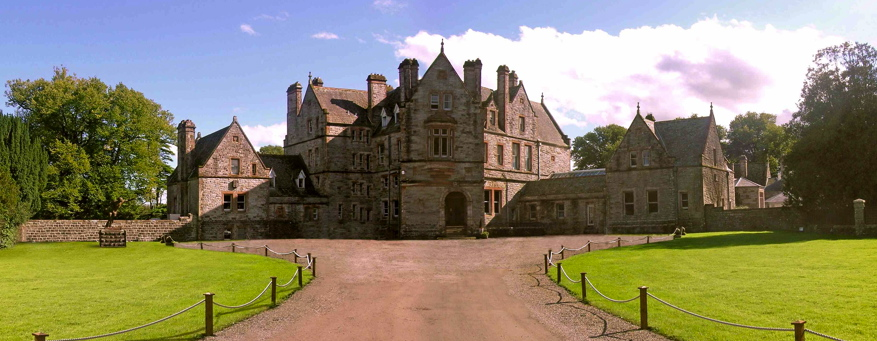
- West front of the Castle
- Interactive map of the Castle Leslie Estate area

General information
- Architectural style: Scots Baronial
- Location: Glaslough, County Monaghan, Ireland
- Construction started: 1870
- Completed: 1871
- Client: Sir John Leslie

Design and construction
- Architect: William Henry Lynn
- Engineer: None

Castle Leslie, also known as Glaslough House, is home to an Irish branch of Clan Leslie, is located on the 4 km^{2} (1,000-acre) Castle Leslie Estate adjacent to the village of Glaslough, 11 km (7 mi) northeast of Monaghan town in County Monaghan, Ireland.

== Architecture ==
There was a 17th-century Leslie mansion at Glaslough until the 19th century when much of it was demolished by Sir John Leslie. Jonathan Swift stayed at that mansion and described it as 'With rows of books upon its shelves, written by Leslies all about themselves.'

The current castle is fashioned in the Scottish baronial style and was designed by the firm of Lanyon, Lynn and Lanyon in 1870 for Sir John Leslie, 1st Baronet, MP. It is situated where an earlier castle stood and never had a defensive purpose. The country house presents a rather dour and austere façade and is sited in such a way so as to mask the gardens to an approaching visitor. To the rear of the house the gardens are relieved by a Renaissance style cloister, allegedly designed to ape Michelangelo's cloister at Santa Maria degli Angeli e dei Martiri in Rome. This links the main house to a single-storey wing containing the Library and Billiard Room. In contrast to the exterior designed by W.H. Lynn, the interior shows the hands of Lanyon and John Leslie himself through its strong Italian Renaissance feel.

== The estate ==
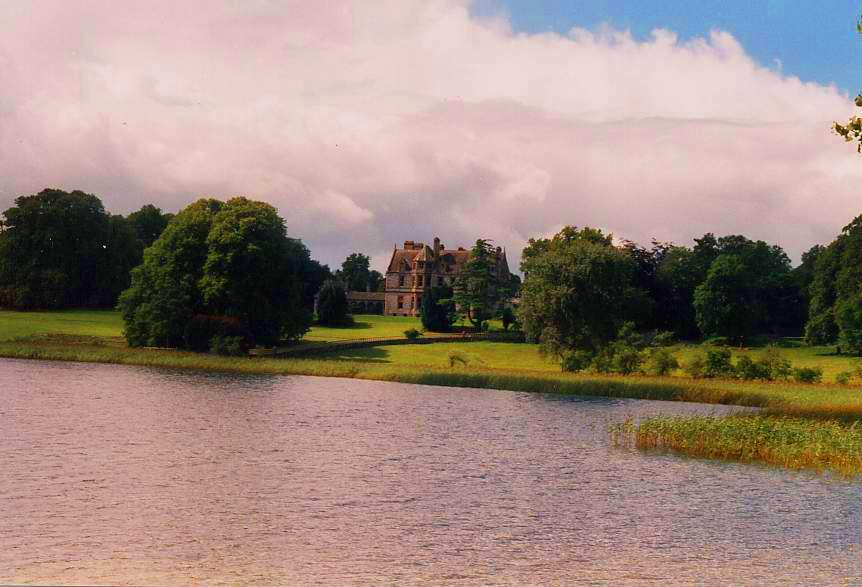
Castle Leslie, from Glasloch

The estate has three lakes: the largest, Glaslough (from the Irish Glas Loch or Glasloch, meaning Green Lake), shares its name with the local village; Kilvey Lake is to the north; and, finally, there is Dream Lake, which features a crannóg. The 1,000-acre (4.0 km^{2}) estate comprises park land, meandering streams and several forests. The house is still home to the Leslie family; the late Sir Jack Leslie (6 December 1916 – 16 April 2016) returned to live in The Castle at the age of 78 and the principal owner is Samantha (Sammy) Leslie. Other family members still assert their influence on the running of the estate through a family trust.

== Events and visitors ==
Castle Leslie Estate gained media attention in 2002 when Sir Paul McCartney married Heather Mills in the family church located on the estate, followed by a wedding banquet for 300 guests prepared by the castle's then executive chef, Noel McMeel.

Throughout the years numerous famous people have frequented the house. This includes Irish poet W. B. Yeats, Irish statesman General Michael Collins, Rolling Stones frontman Sir Mick Jagger (1966), British astronomer Sir Patrick Moore and the Duc de Valentinois. The estate has also had various members of the Churchill family within the house due to familial ties with the Leslies.
