= Bellamont House =

Palladian house in County Cavan, Ireland

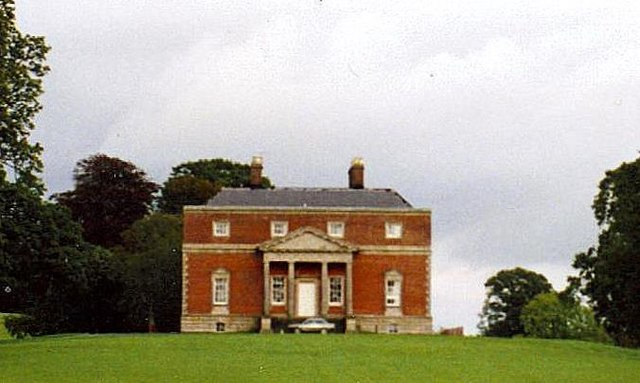

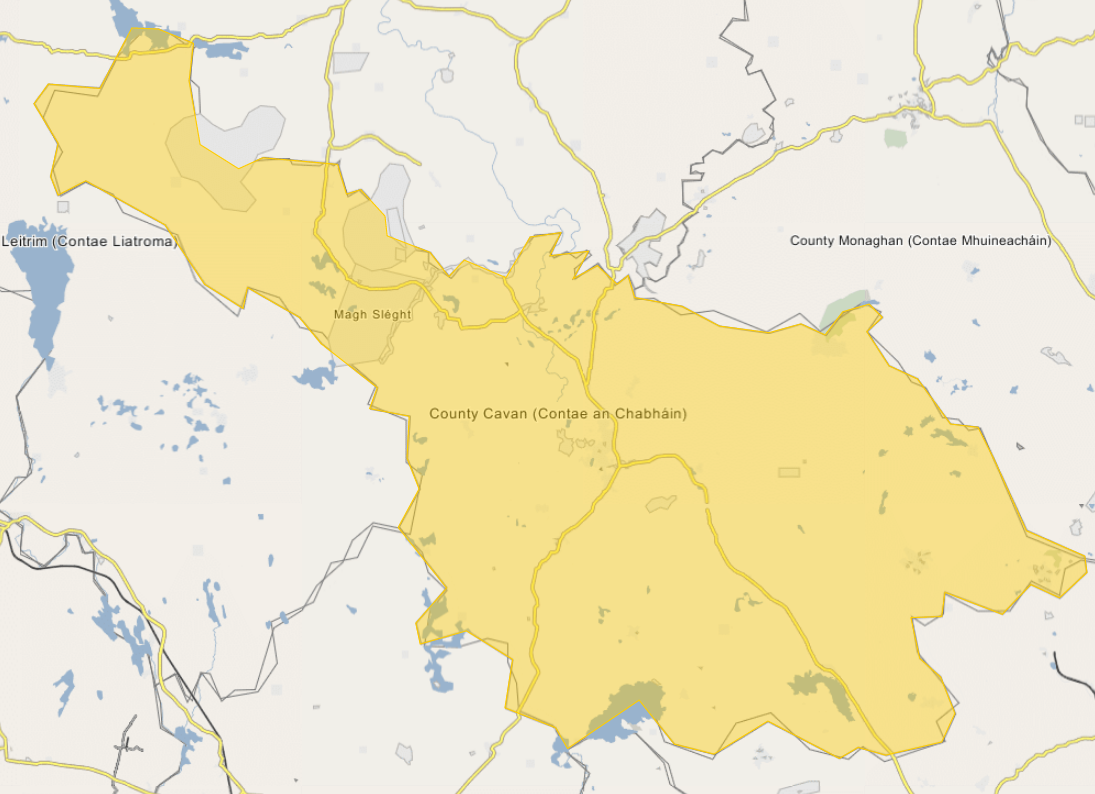
- Location within County Cavan Location within Ireland
- Alternative names: Bellamont Forest

General information
- Status: Private dwelling house
- Type: House
- Architectural style: Palladian
- Location: Bellamont Forest, Cootehill, County Cavan, Cootehill, Ireland
- Coordinates: 54.0868055°N 7.0701729°W
- Elevation: 50 m (160 ft)
- Groundbreaking: 1725
- Owner: John Manuel Morehart

Technical details
- Material: limestone, brick
- Floor count: 3
- Floor area: 1,032 m^{2} (11,110 sq ft)
- Grounds: 175.83 ha (434.5 acres)

Design and construction
- Architect: Edward Lovett Pearce
- Developer: Coote Family

Bellamont House (sometimes Bellamont Forest) is a Georgian Palladian-style house set amongst 1,000 acres (400 hectares) of grounds in Cootehill, County Cavan, Ireland. The house was completed in 1730 for Judge Thomas Coote and designed by his nephew, the architect Edward Lovett Pearce.

It is considered to be one of the finest and earliest examples of Palladian architecture in Ireland, and was loosely modelled on Andrea Palladio's Villa La Rotonda in Vicenza, Italy.

The name of the house is a reference to the Earl of Bellomont.

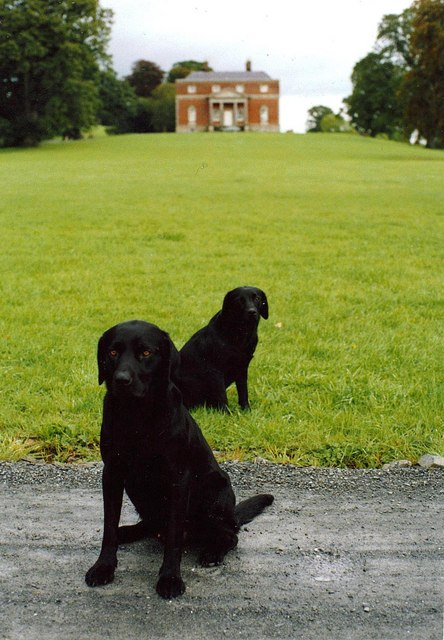
Bellamont House from a distance

== History ==
=== Coote family ownership ===
The house was constructed for Thomas Coote, whose 3rd wife Anne Lovett Tighe was an aunt of the architect, Edward Lovett Pearce.

It likely passed to his son, Charles Coote (1695–1750) on his death in 1741 and from him to his son Charles Coote, 1st Earl of Bellomont on his death in 1750.

When Richard Coote, 3rd Earl of Bellomont died in 1766, the Bellamont title became extinct; however the title of Baron of Collooney passed to his cousin Charles Coote, 1st Earl of Bellomont, who managed to revive the earldom and became Earl of Bellomont in 1767. The house passed down through the family in 1800 to an illegitimate son of Charles, by the name of Charles Johnston Coote, but the titles became extinct on his death.

Charles Johnston Coote became High Sheriff of Cavan in 1807 and later in 1810 married Louisa, a daughter of Richard Dawson of nearby Dartrey Forest, and he lived until 1842 when the house passed to his eldest son, Dawson Richard Coote (1811–50).

The house was owned and occupied by a minor, Richard Coote, at the time of Griffith's Valuation around 1857 and administered by Colonel Charles George Henry Coote of H.M. Indian Service.

In 1857 and 1859 portions of the extensive land holdings in the estate were offered for sale in the Landed Estates Court.

The house was later sold on by George Coote in 1875.

=== Smith family ownership ===
In 1875 the house was acquired by Edward Smith for a sum of £145,000. Smith had made a fortune from trading coal on the Newry to Liverpool route and married an Isabella Cullen of Liverpool. He later became High Sheriff of Cavan in 1878.

Later his son Major Edward Patrick Dorman Smith became High Sheriff of Cavan in 1897 and 1898 after marrying Amy Patterson in 1894.

Eric Dorman-Smith, grandson of Edward Smith, inherited the property on the death of his father in 1948, after serving in the British army in both world wars before resigning his commission in late 1944. Dorman-Smith later changed his name to O'Gowan and became a Republican; he allowed the IRA to use the estate during the border campaign in the 1950s. He died in May 1969.

=== Mills family ownership ===
The house remained in the hands of the extended Smith family until sold to Bryan and Catherine Mills in 1981. The Mills family lived in Bellamont as their primary home, and spent 2 years replacing the roof, updating the electric wiring, and restoring and rescuing some of the internal roofing, which was rotten. The Mills family were the first in Ireland to receive a government grant towards the restoration of the house. While in their ownership RTE recorded and broadcast a programme about the house, and the work done by the Mills family. Also, during their ownership, it was voted the best done up house in the British Isles, by John Fitzmaurice-Mills (no relative).

=== Return to Coote ownership ===
The property was acquired by a distant relation of the Coote family, Australian interior designer John Coote (former husband of Australian MP Andrea Coote) who purchased the House in 1989 for £500,000 Irish pounds. Coote continued the upkeep of the house, and restored the stables, walled garden and workers housing over the following two decades, before dying suddenly in 2012 while the property was for sale.

=== John Morehart ownership ===
The property was finally sold by a Receiver to an American lawyer, John Morehart in 2015 for €2m. Morehart went about sensitively restoring the property including reacquiring the marble busts which had adorned the house for at least 200 years before being removed from the state by the descendants of the previous owner. He also further consolidated the grounds of the estate, improved water quality in the adjacent lakes and commenced the restoration of hundreds of acres of native woodland through new planting and management of the intensive conifer forests. He died in December 2025 aged 69.

Part of the grounds had been earlier leased to the state-owned forestry company Coillte. In 2021, Coillte relinquished its leasehold of the forestry element of the estate.

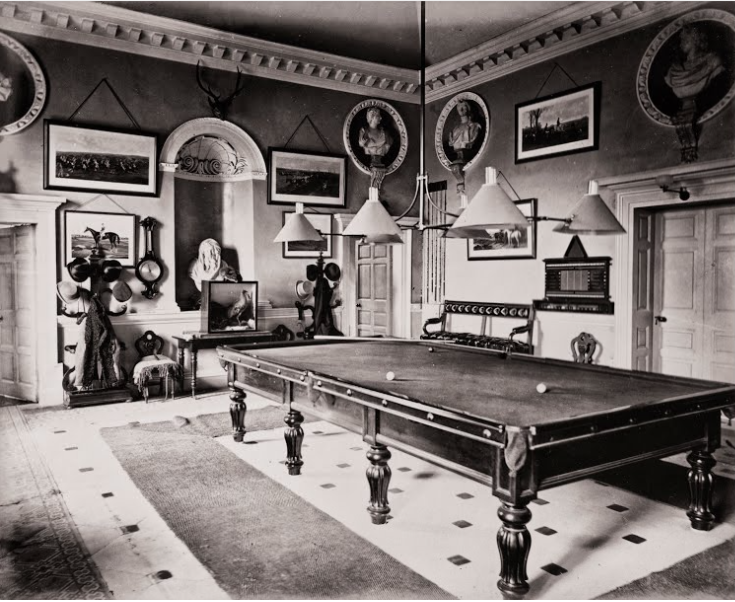
Bellamont forest billiard room c1870

== Description ==
Bellamont House in 1870

The house is a Palladian style square-plan, four-bay two storey over basement villa set amidst a rolling drumlin landscape. It is faced with red brick, with limestone quoins to the ground floor level, and rusticated stone facing to the raised basement level. A protruding Doric entrance portico to the front of the building is also constructed in limestone atop a stone plinth, while the broad steps leading up to the villa are sided with ashlar. There are pediments over the ground floor windows with sandstone surrounds and Venetian windows to the sides of the property. The property sits on a hill at the highest point in the surrounding area facing mature woodland, pasture, lakes and rivers.

The interior contains marble busts of various members of the Coote family, while the entrance hall is paved with Portland stone slabs and contains a coffered elaborate plasterwork ceiling.

The house is approached by a long driveway along Town Lough from the town of Cootehill.

== See also ==
- Dartrey Forest
- Cabra Castle
