= Edward Lovett Pearce =

Irish architect (1699–1733)

- Born: 1699; County Meath, Ireland
- Died: 7 December 1733 (aged 34); Stillorgan, County Dublin, Ireland
- Resting place: Donnybrook Cemetery
- Occupation: Architect
- Parent(s): Edward Pearce (father); Frances Lovett (mother)
- Relatives: John Vanbrugh (cousin); Thomas Pearce (uncle); Frances (sister); Christopher Lovett (grandfather)
- Buildings: Castletown House; Bellamont House; Parliament House; 9 & 10 Henrietta Street; Desart Court; Cashel Palace; Summerhill House

Edward Lovett Pearce (1699 – 7 December 1733) was an Irish architect, and the chief exponent of Palladianism in Ireland. He is thought to have initially studied as an architect under his father's first cousin, Sir John Vanbrugh. He is best known for the Irish Houses of Parliament in Dublin, and his work on Castletown House. The architectural concepts he employed on both civic and private buildings were to change the face of architecture in Ireland. He could be described as the father of Irish Palladian architecture and Georgian Dublin.

== Early life ==
Edward Lovett Pearce was born about 1699 in County Meath and was the only child of General Edward Pearce from Whitlingham, Norfolk, a first cousin of the architect Sir John Vanbrugh, and Frances, daughter of Christopher Lovett, Lord Mayor of Dublin 1676–77. In that same year Vanbrugh was beginning work on his first great architectural commission of Castle Howard which was the first truly baroque house in England, ironically Vanbrugh's new cousin was to be one of the leading architects whose designs were to overthrow the baroque fashion less than 28 years later.

In 1715 following the death of his father, Pearce became a pupil of his eminent architect cousin, it is therefore likely that Pearce would have had the opportunity to see first hand and study the plans and building of Blenheim Palace, where work, following the death of Queen Anne, had just restarted, and was midway through its fraught and frequently interrupted construction. It seems though, that at this age Pearce was still uncertain if he wanted an architectural career, as aged 17 he joined the army serving as a cornet in the dragoons under the command of a Colonel Morris.

Following his time in the army, he decided circa 1722, to return to his first career and again began to study architecture, he did this by studying the architectural masterpieces of France and Italy. However it was in the Veneto that he found the style of architecture which was to influence him most. He made detailed drawings of many of the great villas designed by Palladio which were to serve as the inspiration for his later work. He met in Italy the Florentine architect Alessandro Galilei, who was working from afar on a vast grandiose mansion near Dublin – Castletown.

He spent some time in Norfolk in the 1720s, where he carried out a number of architectural commissions for local families including for the original iteration of Shadwell Court (1727–29) along with his distant relative, the amateur architect John Buxton.

About 1725, Edward married Ann, his own first-cousin, daughter of General Thomas Pearce and Mary Hewes. They were to have four daughters who inherited great-grandfather Pearce's manor of Whitlingham by Norwich, Norfolk. They were: Mary, Mrs Lewis Thomas then Mrs James Slator but mother of Major-General Lewis Thomas; Anne, Mrs Chambre Hallowes; Frances, Mrs Benjamin Lake; and Henrietta, Mrs Charles Willington. He remained a captain in Colonel Clement Neville's Dragoons.

== Architectural career ==
By 1724, Pearce had returned to Ireland to become a practising architect in Dublin, It would appear that as the only Irish architect, at the time, to have studied in Italy, his classical concepts were to win him instant recognition, his architectural success seems to have been almost instantaneous; no doubt helped by his contacts and position in Irish society and even more undoubtedly by his association with William Conolly and Castletown.

During the 1730s, Lovett Pearce employed William Halfpenny as an assistant and he used the alias Michael Hoare while travelling throughout Ireland.

=== Castletown ===
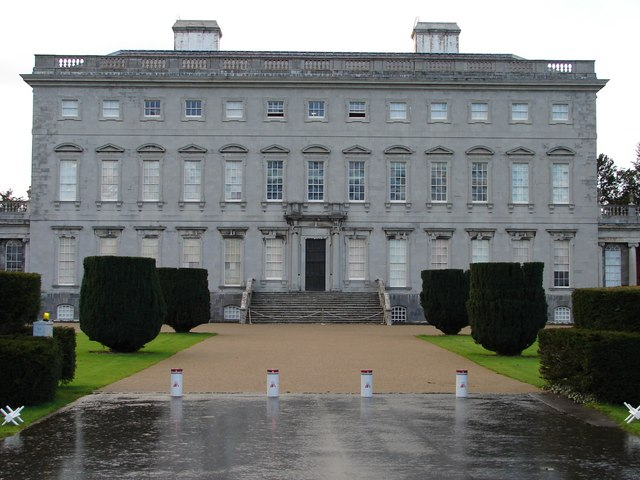
Castletown House in County Kildare

Castletown House is the largest and one of the most important country houses in Ireland, it also claims to be the house which introduced Palladianism to Ireland. The mansion was commissioned by William Conolly (1662–1729), a self-made man who had risen from humble origins through astute property dealings to become one of the wealthiest and influential men in Ireland. The original plans were drawn by Alessandro Galilei circa 1718, the new mansion was intended to reflect Conolly's political power as Lord Justice of Ireland. Galilei though returned to Italy in 1719, having drawn the plans, but not waiting to see building on the Castletown site commence. In fact work was not to start until 1722. For two years, the project seems to have continued unsupervised, until in 1724, it was taken over by the twenty-five-year-old Edward Lovett Pearce. Just returned to Ireland from Italy, it is likely that Pearce had been working on the plans with Galilei there. Hence Pierce's connection with Castletown probably predates his return to Ireland. It is possible that it was to oversee the building of Castletown that provided Pearce with the impetus to return home to Ireland. Building at Castletown was to continue for the rest of Pearce's life.

It is not known precisely how much of Castletown is Galilei's work and how much Pearce's. If in Italy Pearce had been employed by Galilei and worked on the plans, then, as was the custom of the time, Pearce's work as an employee would have been credited to his master. Galilei was certainly responsible for devising the overall scheme of a principal centre mansion, flanked by colonnades leading to two service wings, in the true Palladian manner. Castletown was the first house in Ireland designed with this layout. The rigid symmetry of Castletown's classical façades, designed by Galilei was to be typical too of Pearce's later work.

The interiors and final room plans are believed to be the work of Pearce, however the long suite of reception rooms along the ground-floor garden front, are not in the strict Palladian tradition. Such a mansion as Castletown, in Italy, would have been a town Palazzo rather than a country villa. The long suite of room with a central salon, terminating with smaller rooms at the end of the enfilade is more typical of the suites of state rooms in English country houses at the time. The central saloon at Castletown opens into the two-storey entrance hall, which is traversed by a corridor running the length of the mansion; the principal staircase is situated in an adjoining hall to the side of the great hall. In this layout of state rooms, hall and staircase Castletown is similar to Blenheim Palace, which Pearce had studied while a student of Vanbrugh. (While Pearce designed the staircase it was not actually constructed until 1760, some 28 years after his death.)

=== Bellamont House ===
Bellamont House in County Cavan

Another of Pearce's earliest commissions occurred when he was commissioned by his mother's brother-in-law Thomas Coote to build Bellamont House, also known as Bellamont Forest, on the outskirts of Cootehill in the north-east of County Cavan. This family connection was not unusual, as several of Pearce's clients were related to him. Like Castletown, Bellamont claims to be Ireland's first Palladian house. Dates attributed to the design range from 1725 to 1730, whatever the date (1725 is probable) it is almost certain that this was the first of Ireland's many Palladian houses to be completed. The four bays square modestly sized mansion is clearly inspired by Palladio's Villa Capra. The principal façade has as its ground floor a rusticated semi-basement, above which is the piano nobile at the centre is a four columned portico with a pediment, the portico is flanked by a single high sash window on each side. The main entrance beneath the one-storey portico is reached by a single flight of broad steps. Above the piano nobile is a secondary floor with windows exactly half the size of those below. The entire façade is just four windows wide. The composition is a hybrid between the grandest of the Veneto's villas and a slightly exalted farmhouse, which ironically was the very intention of Palladio's original designs 200 years previously. While Castletown is a symbol or wealth and power, the far smaller Bellamont is the greater symbol of Palladianism and architectural perfection. Also during this period of his work Pearce redesigned the south elevation of Drumcondra House (now All Hallows Campus, Dublin).

=== Stillorgan Obelisk ===
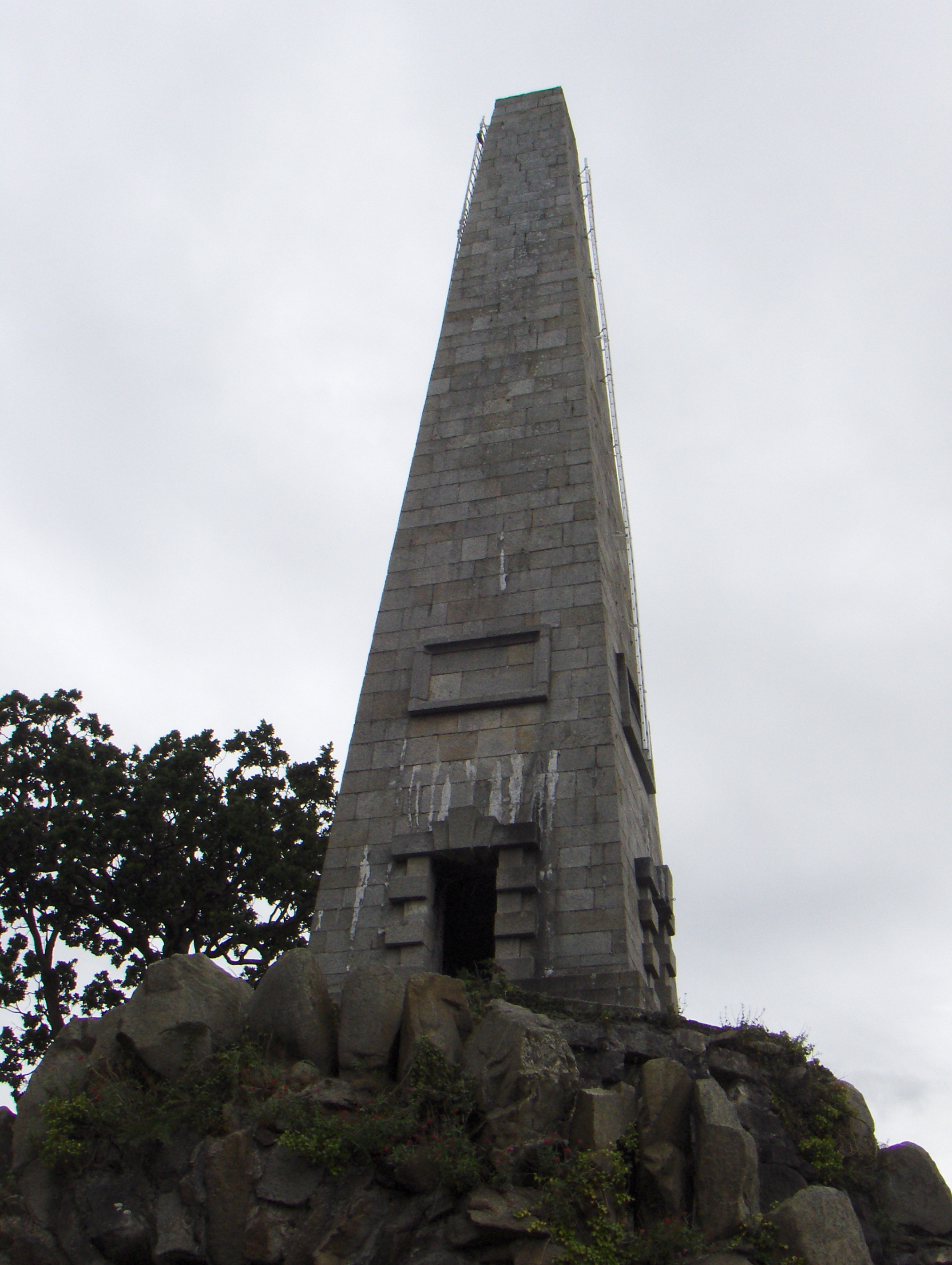
The upper portion of the Stillorgan Obelisk

Following a famine in 1727, an obelisk at Stillorgan, attributed to Pearce, was erected as a memorial to those who had perished. This granite monument, over 100 feet high, contains in its base a large vaulted hall from which rises a staircase leading to a viewing platform. The attribution to Pearce is probable, although the monument is in an almost avant-garde neoclassical style, with Egyptian influences; however Pearce was living in the parish at this time in a house known as The Grove. This large house (subsequently known as Tigh Lorcain Hall) was replaced by the Stillorgan Bowling Alley in 1963.

=== Irish Parliament House ===
In 1727, Pearce was elected member of parliament in the Irish House of Commons for the Ratoath in County Meath, assisted by his patron Speaker Conolly, for whom he was continuously working at Castletown. The Irish Government had decided in that same year to replace their existing meeting place at Chichester House, College Green, Dublin with a new purpose-built parliament building. It was Speaker Conolly who first suggested building the new Parliament House on College Green, therefore it is unsurprising, perhaps, that it was Pearce the member of parliament (MP) and employee of Conolly who was eventually chosen to design the project.

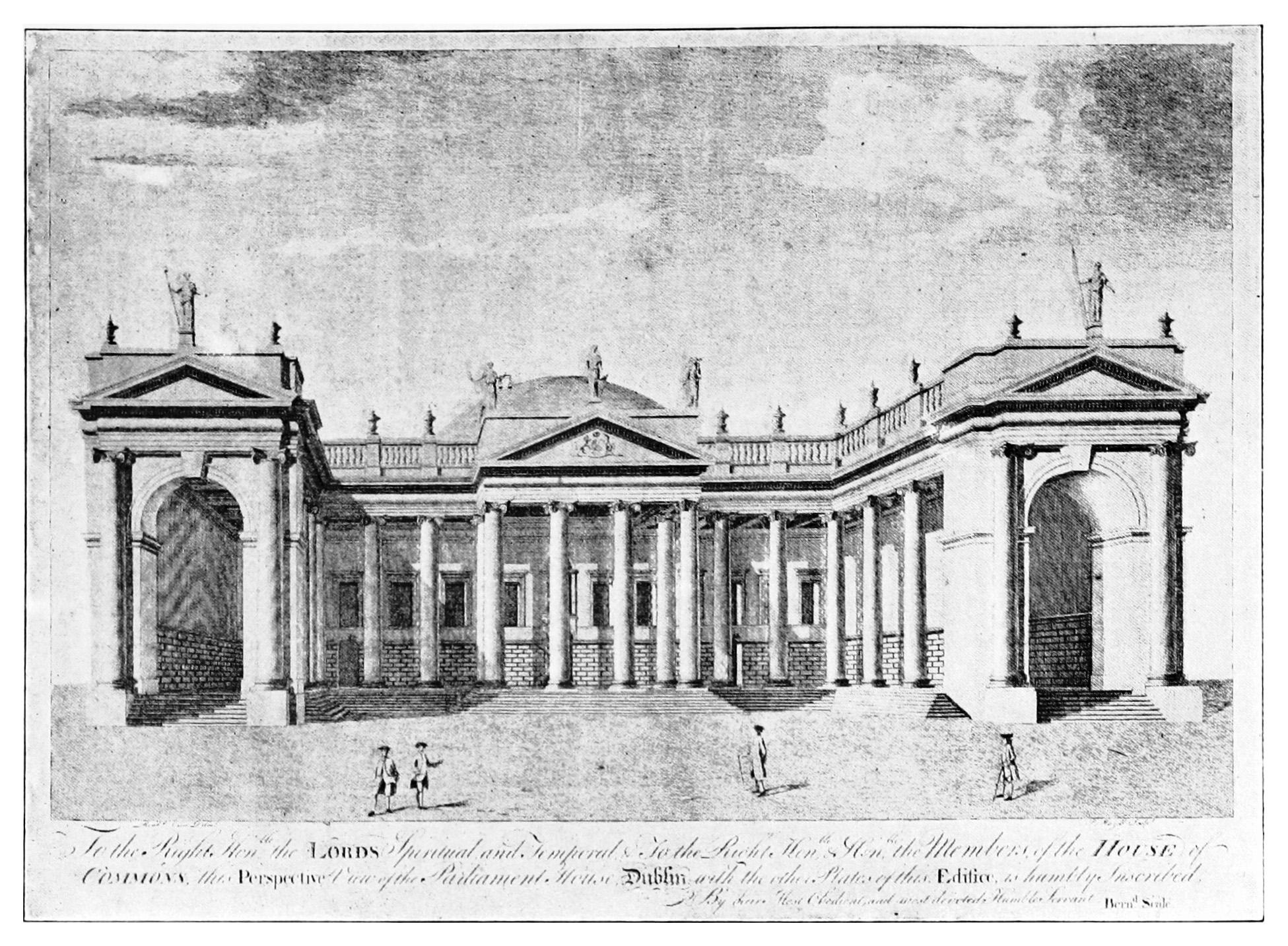
Drawing of the front of Parliament House, Dublin with the dome, seen from the street-level, in the 18th century

The foundation stone of the new Parliament building was laid in 1729, the Palladian design was, as intended, awe inspiring with a huge colonnade facing onto College Green. The two legislator Houses of Parliament contained an octagonal classical temple, complete with Pantheon-style dome, as its House of Commons, (destroyed by fire in 1792). The public gallery here could hold up to 700 spectators, symbolising true open government; the smaller but still exquisite House of Lords survives, along with its central arcade and pediment. The building at the beginning of the 19th century was taken over by the Bank of Ireland, substantial alterations have been made since, including a large extension by Gandon and Johnson. A condition of the sale to the bank was that all signs of Parliament were to be removed. However, the concepts of Pearce are still very evident in the surviving House of Lords.

=== Cashel Palace ===
As architect of the Parliament building, in 1730 Pearce was appointed Surveyor General of Ireland, he succeeded Thomas Burgh. This important position, a mere four years after his return from Italy was the seal on his success. While work was continuing on the parliament building in 1730 Pierce, now Ireland's most famed and sought after architect, was commissioned by Archbishop Theophilus Bolton to build the new bishop's palace, at Cashel, in County Tipperary. The result was a large unostentatious red brick Palladian mansion, on two principal floors, the hipped roof hidden by a brick pediment, the main façade seven bays long had at its centre a three bayed projection, the only ornament was dressed stone double strapping indicating the ground and first floor division. On the ground floor the terminating two bays were replaced by venetian windows. The result was a house of restrained refinement. Pearce also designed the landscaping of the grounds of the palace complete with their private path to Rock of Cashel. The Cashel Palace Hotel now operates from the property.

=== Desart Court ===
Desart Court was constructed in 1733 for the first Lord Desart, John Cuffe. It was a five-bay 2 storey house with a basement. It was ultimately destroyed in a fire by the IRA in 1923.

=== Other buildings ===
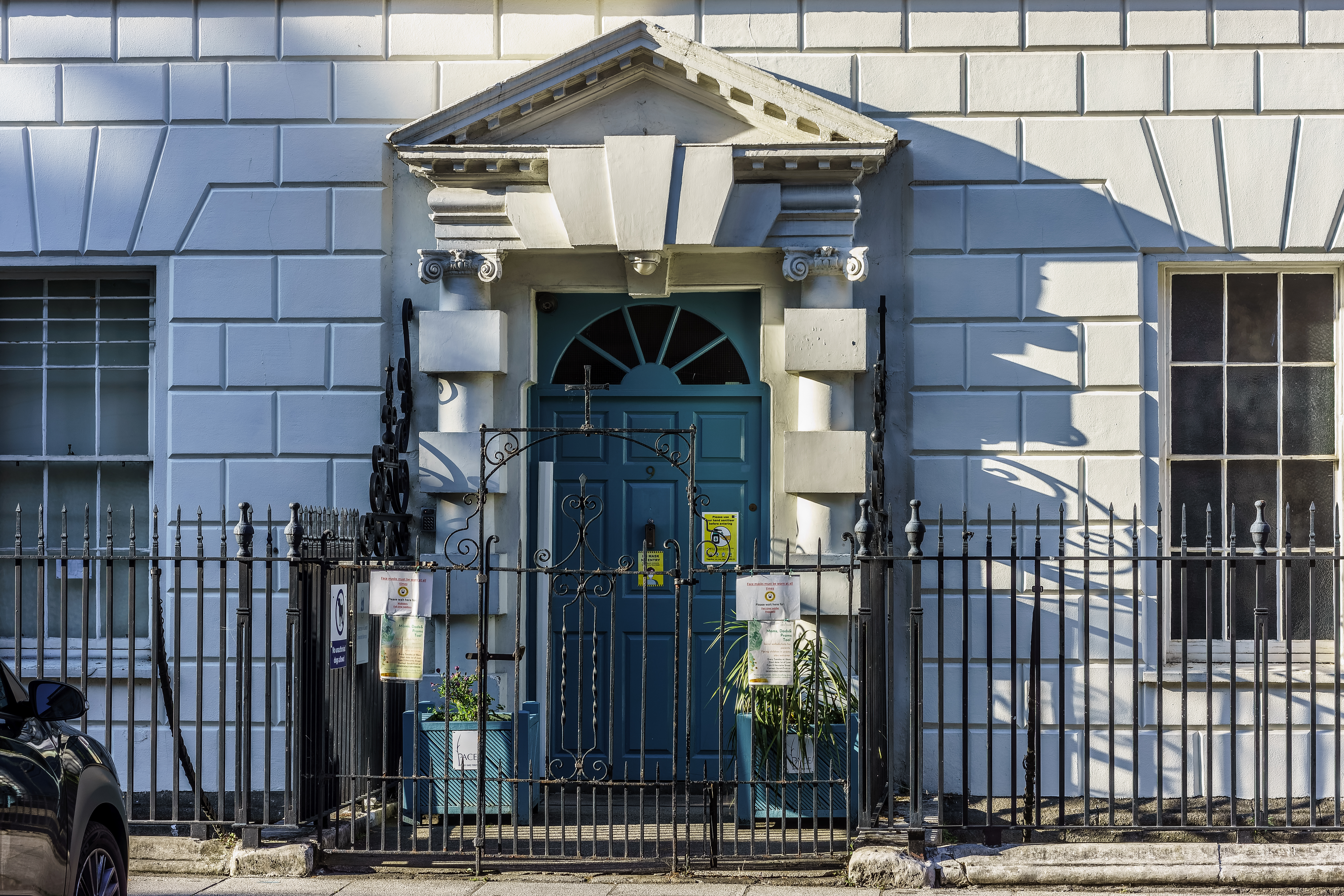
Gibbs surround style doorway of 9 Henrietta Street, Dublin

Among other buildings that Lovett Pearce supposedly designed are:

- Stables at Dartrey Estate
- Deanery House off Fishamble Street (demolished 1886)
- Gloster House, County Offaly
- Woodlands house in Clonshaugh
- Drumcondra House,
- 9 and 10 Henrietta Street and possibly other houses on the Street.
- Summerhill House, County Meath
- Shadwell Court, Norfolk, England (1727–29)

== Legacy ==
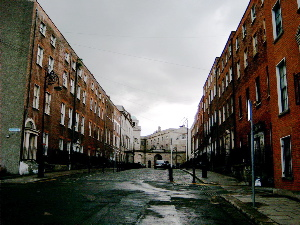
Henrietta Street – one of Dublin's oldest Georgian streets, Edward Lovett Pearce is known to have designed at least two of the houses here.

Following the acclaim given to the new Parliament building, the structure was near enough completed in 1731 for Parliament to be held there, in 1732 Pearce was knighted, this honour was followed by the freedom of the city of Dublin in 1733.

Sir Edward Lovett Pearce was then at the height of his success and popularity. In addition to the better known works described above Pearce worked on numerous other commissions, a vast mansion known at Summerhill House in County Meath (demolished in the 1950s) was attributed to him, although his contemporary, the architect Richard Cassels is thought to have overseen this work.

Pearce also designed smaller and more modest town houses for the wealthy and aristocratic of Dublin; two examples of his work survive in Henrietta Street (illustrated above right). His design at No.9 was for his first cousin Mrs Thomas Carter.

Tragically it was to be a short period, within weeks of receiving the freedom of Dublin, he was struck down with an abscess and died of septicaemia 16 November 1733 at his home, The Grove, Stillorgan, aged just 34. His remains were buried on 10 December 1733 in St Mary's Graveyard, Donnybrook. His widow and four daughters survived him. Ann died at her house in St Stephen's Green Dublin on 15 July 1749 and was buried at Donnybrook on 17 July 1749.

Edward Lovett Pearce's rise had been meteoric; in just six years of architectural practice he had scaled the greatest heights of both private and civic architectural practice. He had introduced Palladianism to a country which was to adopt it with a gusto unlike any other European country. At the time of his death he presided over an entire community of Palladian architects perpetuating his interpretations of Palladio's work throughout Ireland.

== See also ==
- Georgian Dublin
- Architecture of Ireland

Parliament of Ireland
Preceded by Hon. William St Lawrence; Richard Gorges	Member of Parliament for Ratoath; 1727–1734; With: Charles Hamilton	Succeeded by Charles Hamilton; Rowley Hill
Government offices
Preceded by Thomas de Burgh	Surveyor General of Ireland; 1730–1733	Succeeded by Arthur Dobbs
