= Thomas Coote (Irish politician) =

Irish politician and judge

The Honourable Thomas Coote (c. 1655 – 24 April 1741) was an Irish politician and judge, who sat in the Irish House of Commons, and held office as Recorder of Dublin and as a judge of the Court of King's Bench (Ireland). Although he was generally liked and respected, he was removed from the Bench in 1714, and resumed his political career. He was the grandfather of the Earl of Bellomont (third creation), and a noted bibliophile.

== Early life ==
He was the third son of Richard Coote, 1st Baron Coote of Collooney and his wife Mary St. George, daughter of George St George, 1st Baron St George. Richard Coote, 1st Earl of Bellomont (second creation), the controversial governor of New York and Massachusetts, was his eldest brother; Richard was born in 1636, but Thomas, who outlived him by forty years, must have been much younger than his brother. He was the heir of his uncle, also named Thomas Coote, of Cootehill, County Cavan. Thomas was "bred to the law": he entered Middle Temple in 1683, returned to Ireland in 1684 to practice at the Irish Bar, and entered the King's Inns the same year.

== Judge ==
Like his brother Richard, Thomas was a strong supporter of the Glorious Revolution. After King James II, who had been deposed in the Revolution landed in Ireland in 1689, Thomas was attainted by the Patriot Parliament and his property was forfeited. He moved to England and apparently thought of settling there permanently; but in 1690, following the downfall of King James's cause at the Battle of the Boyne, he returned to Ireland. He became Recorder of Dublin later the same year and entered Parliament as member for Dublin in 1692. In 1693 he was appointed to the Court of King's Bench. In 1697 he was Commissioner of the Great Seal of Ireland.

=== Hurley case ===
In 1701 he presided over the celebrated case of R v. Hurley. Patrick Hurley, a law student at Gray's Inn, was charged with conspiracy and perjury in that he had fraudulently petitioned the Crown for £1000 as compensation for malicious damage for money supposedly stolen from him by highwaymen. The case aroused a degree of public interest which is not easy now to explain, since the accused, as far as is known, was neither rich nor socially prominent. The trial was treated as a serious one by the Crown, again for reasons which are not clear. The verdict was guilty, after the jury heard overwhelming evidence that Hurley had stolen the money himself. Coote, unusually in a criminal case at the time, sat as a single judge, rather than as one of a bench of two or three judges. The rule then was that no trial could go into a second day, and thus the burden on a single judge must have been very great, since it is clear that the court sat from early in the morning, and the jury did not retire until "the day was going out". According to Ball, the trial records indicate that Coote showed himself an active and conscientious judge, questioning all the witnesses vigorously, although Comyn states that his summing up was rather brief. The sentence- a £100 fine or imprisonment in default of payment - was, for the time, relatively lenient.

=== Controversies ===
In 1705 he caused some controversy by delivering a charge to a grand jury against seditious books, which was thought by his political opponents to be an attack on the Tory party. In 1711, apparently fearing that he was about to be removed from the bench, he went to London to seek a testimonial to his character and political opinions from Jonathan Swift. In the event he kept his office for another three years, and was drawn into the bitter feud between the Crown and Dublin Corporation in 1713–4, on which, together with some of his colleagues, he signed a number of reports which were seen as partisan. Questioned years later about these reports in the Commons he defended himself on the ground that "all men make mistakes".

== Later career ==
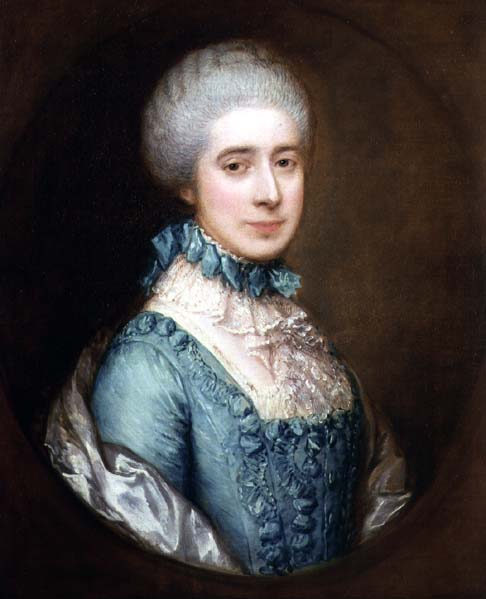
Mrs Crewe, the celebrated political hostess, was Thomas Coote's great-great-granddaughter

On the death of Queen Anne, her Irish judges were removed from office en bloc, on account of their political sympathies, and some were threatened with impeachment. For most of them, including Coote, the disgrace was temporary: his loyalty to the new dynasty was not seriously in question, and he was extremely popular: the author John Dunton called him "a man who was universally loved". He re-entered the House of Commons as knight of the shire for County Monaghan in 1723, lost his seat in 1727 but regained it in 1733. He died at Cootehill in 1741, aged about 86.

== Descendants ==
He married firstly Frances Copley, daughter of Colonel Christopher Copley of Wadworth and Mary Jones, daughter of Roger Jones, 1st Viscount Ranelagh, and had a son, Chidley, who died unmarried before his father.

He married secondly his distant cousin Eleanor St George, daughter of Sir Thomas St George, Garter King at Arms, of Woodford, Essex and his first wife Clara Pymlowe, and had a son Thomas who died young and a daughter Mary.

He married thirdly Anne Lovett, daughter of Christopher Lovett, an Alderman of Dublin, and widow of William Tighe of Rutland, County Carlow, and had nine children of whom at least five—Charles, Francis, Elizabeth, Catherine and Anne—survived infancy. Charles was the father of Charles Coote, 1st Earl of Bellomont. Through his daughter Catherine (c.1690-1731) Thomas was the ancestor of the poet Frances Greville and the noted political hostess Frances Anne Crewe. His daughter Elizabeth married Mervyn Pratt MP of Cabra Castle, High Sheriff of Cavan, and had issue. The Pratt family owned Cabra until 1950.

== Character ==
Coote was a popular and respected figure, noted for his religious piety, charity and love of books. As a politician he was deeply interested in encouraging the linen trade, and wrote a treatise on the cultivation of flax and hemp.
