= Charles Coote (1695–1750) =

Irish politician

Charles Coote (c. 15 September 1695 – 19 October 1750) was an Irish politician.

Coote was educated at Trinity College Dublin.

Coote was the son of Thomas Coote, a leading politician and judge, and his third wife Anne Lovett, daughter of Alderman Christopher Lovett and widow of William Tighe (1657-1679) of County Carlow. He was a grandson of Richard Coote, 1st Baron Coote. He was baptised on 15 September 1695.

He was High Sheriff of Cavan in 1719. He served as Member of the Parliament of Ireland (MP) for Granard from 1723 to 1727, and for County Cavan from 1727 to 1750. He married Prudence Geering, daughter of Richard Geering, in 1722 and had one son and seven daughters. His son Charles became Lord Coote of Coloony, later Earl of Bellomont.
