= Brosna =

Brosna, a geographical name in Ireland, may refer to:

- Brosna, County Kerry, a village and parish
- Brosna, County Offaly, a village and townland
- River Brosna, a river in counties Westmeath and Offaly
- Little Brosna River, a river in County Offaly
