= Bartholomew Mosse =

Irish physician

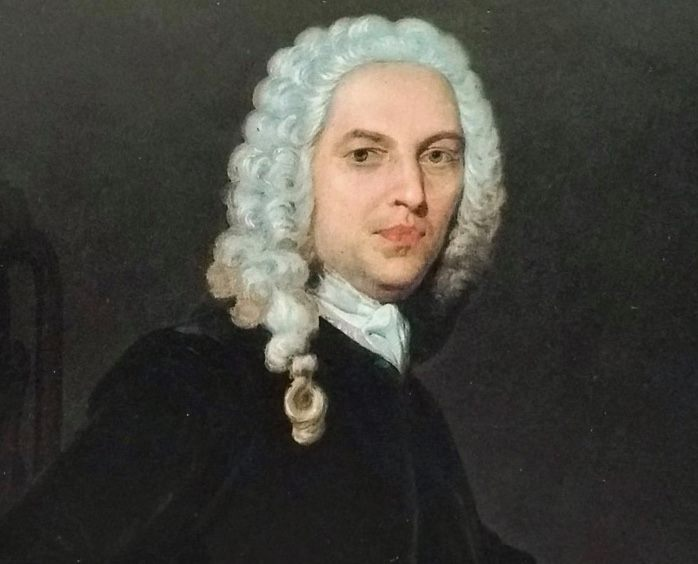
- 1759 portrait of Mosse
- Born: 1712; Maryborough (now Portlaoise), Ireland
- Died: 16 February 1759 (aged 46–47); Dublin, Ireland
- Occupation: Physician
- Spouse(s): Mary Elizabeth Mallory (1734-?), Jane Wittingham (1742-1759)

Bartholomew Mosse (1712 – 16 February 1759) was an Irish physician. He was responsible for founding the Rotunda Hospital in Dublin.

== Early and personal life ==
Mosse was born in 1712, in Dysart, two kilometers east of Portlaoise (then called Maryborough), the fifth son of seven children born to William Mosse, a Protestant clergyman, and Martha Boyle. Some sources suggest he may have been born in Wexford. Bartholomew apprenticed with John Stone as a barber surgeon from 1729 to 1733, when he passed the examination by the surgeon-general. He married Mary Elizabeth Mallory in 1734, and they had a son, Michael, who was born in 1737. While historical records are unclear, it appears that both mother and infant died shortly thereafter.

In 1738, Mosse was appointed surgeon in charge of the draft of troops to Menorca, following which he spent time travelling through Europe. It is believed that it was during this time that he decided to focus on midwifery, to which end he observed maternity care in Paris, among other cities.

In 1742, Mosse married his cousin, Jane Wittingham, with whom he had two children: Charles and Jane, born in 1745 and 1746, respectively. Charles went on to became a Church of Ireland rector and served on the board of governors of the Rotunda hospital from 1769. Jane married Col. Henry Monck-Mason in 1774 and their son, William Monck Mason, donated a portrait of Mosse based on a sketch by James Forde to the Rotunda in 1833. Mosse adopted and trained his nephew, Thomas Mosse, who went on to the appointed the chaplain of the Rotunda in 1763 and governor in 1768.

== The Dublin Lying-In Hospital ==
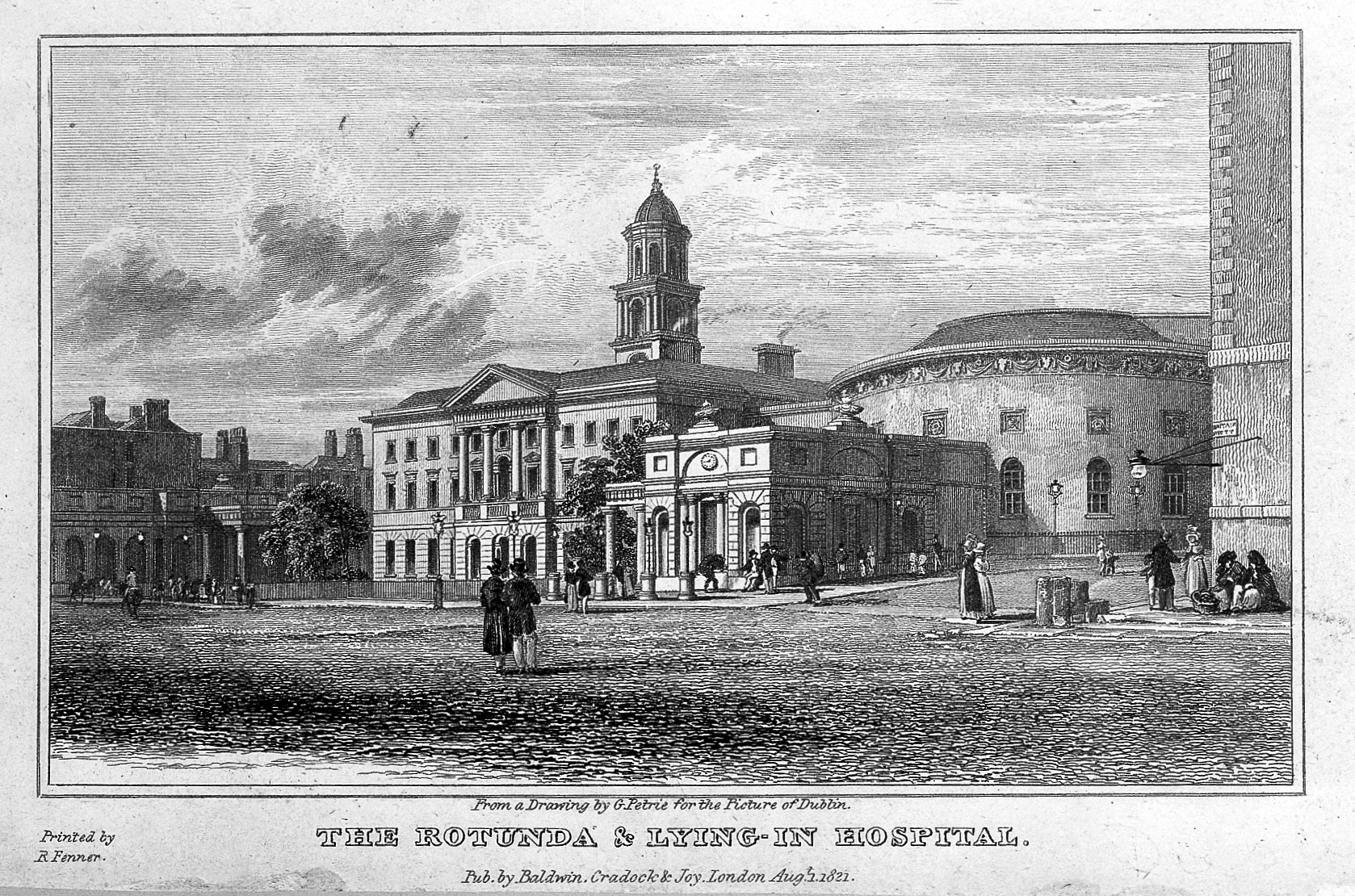
The Lying-in Hospital, Rotunda circa 1820

By 1743, Mosse had determined to raise money for a purpose-built maternity hospital, which he achieved through subscriptions, as well as the patronage of many of Dublin's prominent citizens. With this money, he purchased an old theatre in George's Lane, which he converted into the Lying-In Hospital, opening in 1745.

Demand soon outstripped the capacity of the hospital, and Mosse staged theatrical productions to raise money for expansion. He also purchased land on the outskirts of the city, where he constructed a pleasure garden, concert hall and coffee house, known as the New Gardens. Profit from this venture was used to construct the Rotunda Hospital, designed by Richard Cassels, which opened on 8 December 1757.

== Personal life and death ==
Mosse spent a considerable amount of his personal fortune on this venture, falling into debt, and eventually being imprisoned for indebtedness, although he escaped through a window and went into hiding in Wales. He was also accused of misappropriation of funds, although no formal charges were ever brought, and Mosse was never convicted of any crime.

Mosse died on 16 February 1759, aged 46 or 47, in Dublin, and is interred in Donnybrook Cemetery. His successor at the hospital was Fielding Ould.

An annual lecture, the Bartholomew Mosse Memorial Lecture, was established in 1961 and is held annually on first Friday in November. Mosse was commemorated with a stamp from An Post in 1995.
