= Cootehill =

Town in County Cavan, Ireland

Cootehill Muinchille
- Town
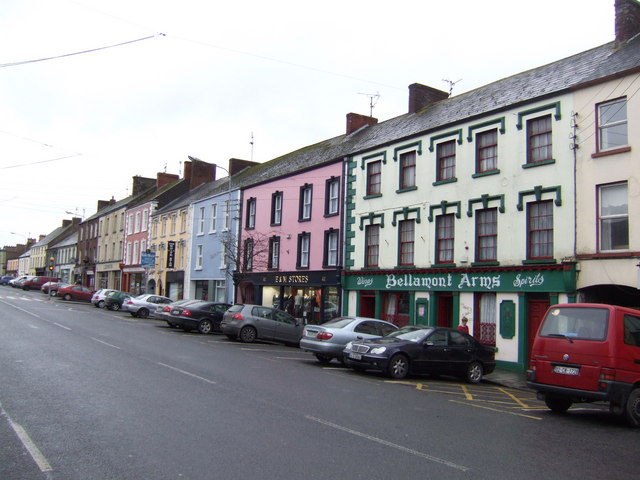
- Market Street, Cootehill, in 2008

- Location in Ireland
- Coordinates: 54°04′26″N 7°04′51″W
- Country: Ireland
- Province: Ulster
- County: County Cavan
- Barony: Tullygarvey
- Elevation: 100 m (330 ft)

Population (2022)
  - Total: 1,856
- Time zone: UTC±0 (WET)
  - Summer (DST): UTC+1 (IST)
- Eircode routing key: H16
- Telephone area code: +353(0)49
- Irish Grid Reference: H617133

Historical population
| Year | Pop. | ±% |
|---|---|---|
| 1821 | 2,152 | — |
| 1831 | 2,239 | +4.0% |
| 1841 | 2,425 | +8.3% |
| 1851 | 2,105 | −13.2% |
| 1861 | 1,994 | −5.3% |
| 1871 | 1,851 | −7.2% |
| 1881 | 1,789 | −3.3% |
| 1891 | 1,593 | −11.0% |
| 1901 | 1,509 | −5.3% |
| 1911 | 1,550 | +2.7% |
| 1926 | 1,532 | −1.2% |
| 1936 | 1,598 | +4.3% |
| 1946 | 1,565 | −2.1% |
| 1951 | 1,489 | −4.9% |
| 1956 | 1,540 | +3.4% |
| 1961 | 1,437 | −6.7% |
| 1966 | 1,425 | −0.8% |
| 1971 | 1,542 | +8.2% |
| 1981 | 1,805 | +17.1% |
| 1986 | 1,796 | −0.5% |
| 1991 | 1,791 | −0.3% |
| 1996 | 1,822 | +1.7% |
| 2002 | 1,744 | −4.3% |
| 2006 | 1,892 | +8.5% |
| 2011 | 2,123 | +12.2% |
| 2016 | 1,853 | −12.7% |
| 2022 | 1,856 | +0.2% |

Cootehill (/ˈkuːthɪl/; Irish: Muinchille, meaning 'ridge') is a market town and townland in County Cavan, Ireland. Cootehill was formerly part of the neighbouring townland of Munnilly. Both townlands lie within the barony of Tullygarvey. Cootehill is 20 km north-east of Cavan town and 20 km south-west of Monaghan town. As of the 2022 census, the population was 1,856.

The English language name of the town is a portmanteau of "Coote" and "Hill", the family names of a local 18th century landowning family.

== Name ==
The town's Irish name, Muinchille, derives from the Irish language term meaning a ridge or "sleeve".

The town's name in English, Cootehill, is a portmanteau attributed to the intermarriage of the landowning Coote and Hill families in the early 1700s. This involved the marriage of Thomas Coote (c. 1620–25 Nov 1671) and Frances Hill from Hillsborough, County Down, who were involved in the linen trade. The Coote family of Cootehill had some notable members, including the aforementioned Thomas Coote who was a Cromwellian Colonel and a judge of the Court of King's Bench during the 18th century. Other Cootes served as sheriffs and under-sheriffs in the 19th century. Thomas Coote's great, great nephew was the 1st Earl of Bellomont.

== History ==
Cootehill was formally established as a market town in 1725 when Thomas Coote obtained a charter to hold markets and fairs; thereafter strong ties to the Irish linen industry were cultivated. A description from 1844 states: "The town is comparatively well-built and respectively inhabited; and is not equaled in appearance by any place between it and Dublin except Navan."

The Cootehill of this era has a link to communist and labour history, in that a branch of the International Workingmen's Association (IWA) was established in Cootehill in 1872. This followed the establishment of branches in Dublin, Cork, and Belfast.

Prominent people who have visited the town over the years have included President Mary McAleese, who visited in 2002 to open Damien House near Dartrey Forest. Bertie Ahern, then Taoiseach, visited the town in 2006. Arthur Griffith, founder of Sinn Féin and later President of Dáil Éireann, was elected here in 1918, and Rev. John Wesley, a founder of the evangelical and Methodist movement, visited the town in the mid-18th century. Eoghan Ruadh Ó Néill camped and trained the Ulster Army in Munnilly, in the 1640s during the Irish Confederate Wars.

== Heritage and culture ==
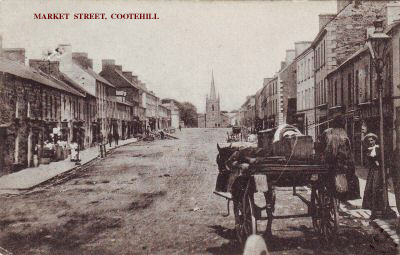
Market Street, Cootehill 1905

=== Built heritage ===
Many of the buildings in the area were built in the 18th and 19th centuries, with a number of Georgian buildings in the town centre. The town has several architecturally notable buildings, including an office with an arched sandstone facade, built for the Provincial Bank (later AIB Bank) in 1858 and designed by architect William G Murray. It stands at the far end of Market Street, and is next door to the Church of Ireland church, built 1819. Within 90 metres stands the renovated St. Michaels Roman Catholic Chapel. The Cootehill Court House is also nearby and was designed and built in 1832 by William Deane Butler. There are also examples of Modern and Postmodern architecture, such as the Cootehill Post Office. The market house was demolished in the 1960s. Cootehill workhouse and infirmary was built in 1841–1842. It was designed by George Wilkinson to accommodate up to 800 inmates, and a fever hospital was added in 1846 during the Great Famine. It closed in 1917 after serving as an asylum for a few years and was demolished in the 1960s.

=== Bellamont House ===
One of the main estate houses in the area, Bellamont Forest, was built between 1725 and 1730 for Thomas Coote, the Lord Justice of Ireland. It was designed by Coote's nephew, architect Edward Lovett Pearce. Pearce's other works include the former Houses of Parliament in College Green in Dublin, now the Bank of Ireland. He later became Surveyor General of Ireland, a post which he held until his death in 1733. Considered one of the finest Palladian villas in Ireland, Bellamont House is not as well known as some of Pearce's other works, but the Coote family who built it are. The first was Sir Charles Coote who died in battle at Trim in 1642, leaving his four estates to his four sons. His youngest son Colonel Thomas Coote was granted the lands in County Cavan after the Act of Settlement in 1662 and was the founder of the town of Cootehill.

=== Music ===
Live music (including irish traditional music, country music, rock music and classical music) is played in the area. The Ulster Fleadh Cheoil has been hosted in Cootehill several times.

== Industry and tourism ==
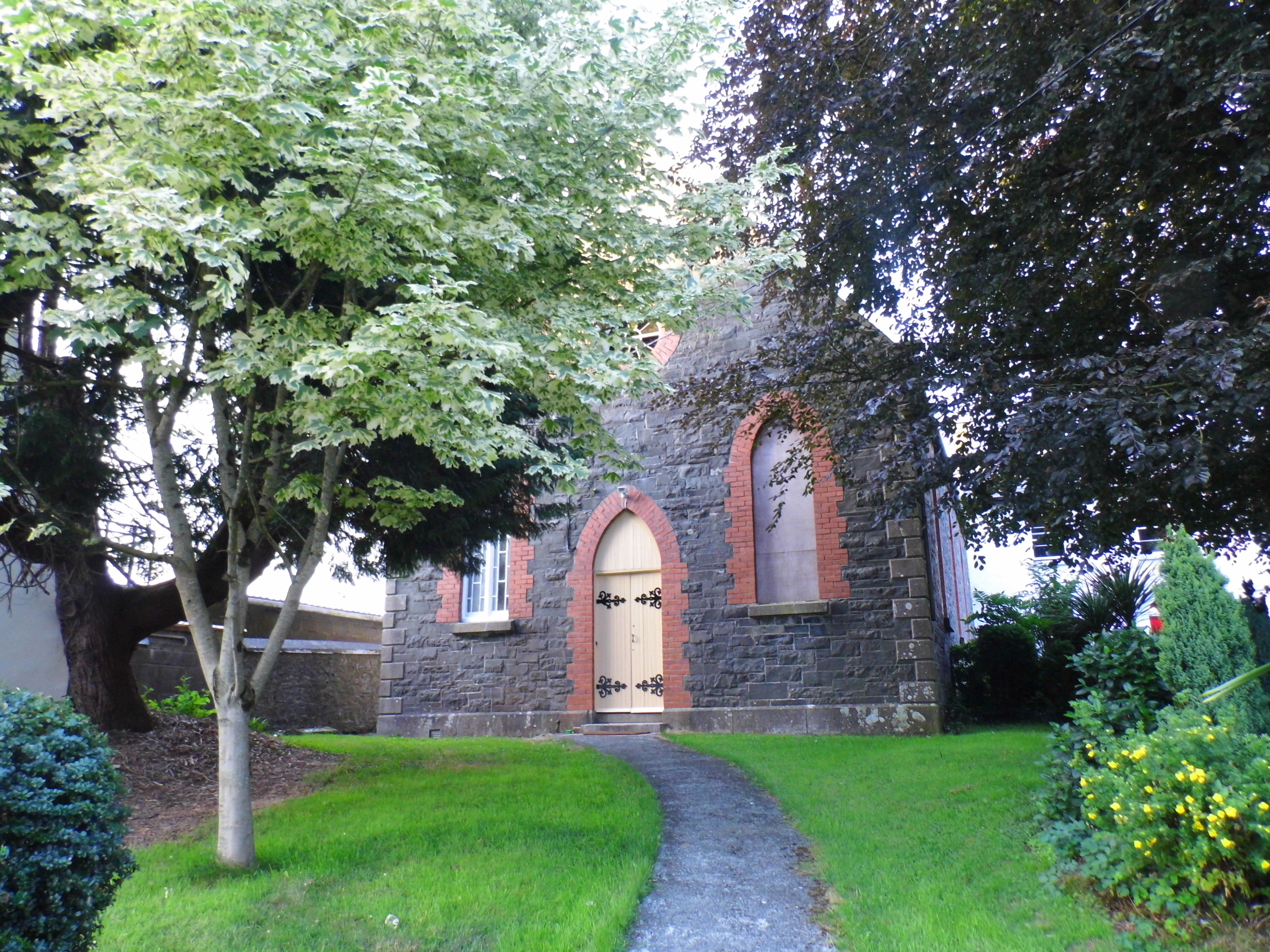
Cootehill's Masonic Hall

In 1837, Cootehill became the site of one of the first eight branches of Ulster Bank which remains to this day. The town is also home to Abbott Laboratories, which manufactures infant formula. Other factories include Eakins and Whelans Shoes, and the Cootehill Enterprise Centre is home to Carleton Bakery. Agriculture and related industry (such as chicken processing and mushroom cultivation), as well as retail, are among the main employers. In the 18th and 19th century Cootehill was a centre for horse-racing.

There is a megalithic tomb in the townland of Cohaw approximately 5 km from Cootehill along the Shercock road.

Bellamont House is an example of Palladian Architecture in Ireland, and remains in a well-preserved condition. The country house was the ancestral seat of the Coote family, Earls of Bellamont. The former Bellamont Estate was a sprawling country estate stretching from the town centre north towards Rockcorry to the right of the Dromore River. The forest was once thickly planted with Norway spruce and other trees, and is now managed by Coillte and was clearcut in the early 1990s.

The estate featured several lakes, a number of gatehouses, pasture, forest, drumlins, and wildlife which includes wild deer and corncrakes. It is bordered by the Dromore River and Dartrey Forest (once part of the former, Dartrey Estate). Most of Bellamont Forest is now designated as Natural Heritage Area by Ireland's National Parks and Wildlife Service.

== Infrastructure ==
At the end of 2006, Bindoo wind farm was completed close to Cootehill supplying the area with 48MW of wind generated electricity.

In 2008, a further two wind farms were constructed namely the 31.5MW wind farm of Mountain Lodge co-owned by Galetech Energy Ltd and Hibernian Wind Ltd and the 3MW two turbine wind project of Edrans wholly owned by Galetech Energy Ltd.

In 2017, a 20.5MW wind farm started construction known as Carrickallen wind farm owned by local company Galetech Energy Developments Ltd.

== Transport ==
The Dundalk and Enniskillen Railway had a branch to Cootehill. Cootehill railway station opened on 18 October 1860, closed for goods and passenger traffic on 10 March 1947, finally closing altogether on 20 June 1955. The line closed under the auspices of the Great Northern Railway after it was nationalised by the two governments.

Traditionally served by Bus Éireann. The service now comprises six journeys each way to/from Cavan and four journeys each way to/from Monaghan Mondays to Fridays inclusive. On Saturdays and Sundays there are two journeys in each direction. There is also a three days a week Route 166 linking the town to Carrickmacross and Dundalk: A company called Sillan operates a through coach service between the town and Dublin.

== Education ==
The town has two national schools: the Darley National School and St. Michael's National School. St Michael's is the larger of the two, with over 200 students from the ages of 4 to 12. The Darley National School is named after the Right Reverend John Darley, the sixth Bishop of Kilmore, Elphin and Ardagh, who established the school in 1859. The local secondary school is St. Aidan's Comprehensive School. The Holy Family School, Monaghan Road, caters to students with special needs. Tanagh Outdoor Education Centre provides adventure sport activities (including canoeing and orienteering) for school groups and others.

== Notable people ==
- Major-General Eric Dorman O'Gowan, a senior-ranking officer in the British Army during the Second World War and an advisor to the IRA executive during the 1950s IRA Border Campaign.
- Colonel Sir Reginald Dorman-Smith, a brother of the above, was an officer in the British Army and later served as the second Governor of Burma.
- Mary Anne Madden Sadlier, author, was born in Cootehill in 1820.
- John Charles McQuaid, Primate of Ireland and Archbishop of Dublin, was born in Cootehill in 1895.
- Paddy Smith, Fianna Fáil T.D. who became the longest-serving member of Dáil Éireann.
- Hughie O'Reilly, Gaelic footballer, who played for many years for the local GAA team, Cootehill Celtic.
- Charlie Gallagher, former Gaelic football player for Cavan in the 1960s.
- Ruairí McKiernan, social campaigner and former member of the Council of State.

== See also ==
- List of towns and villages in the Republic of Ireland
