= Stillorgan Obelisk =

Obelisk in Stillorgan, Ireland

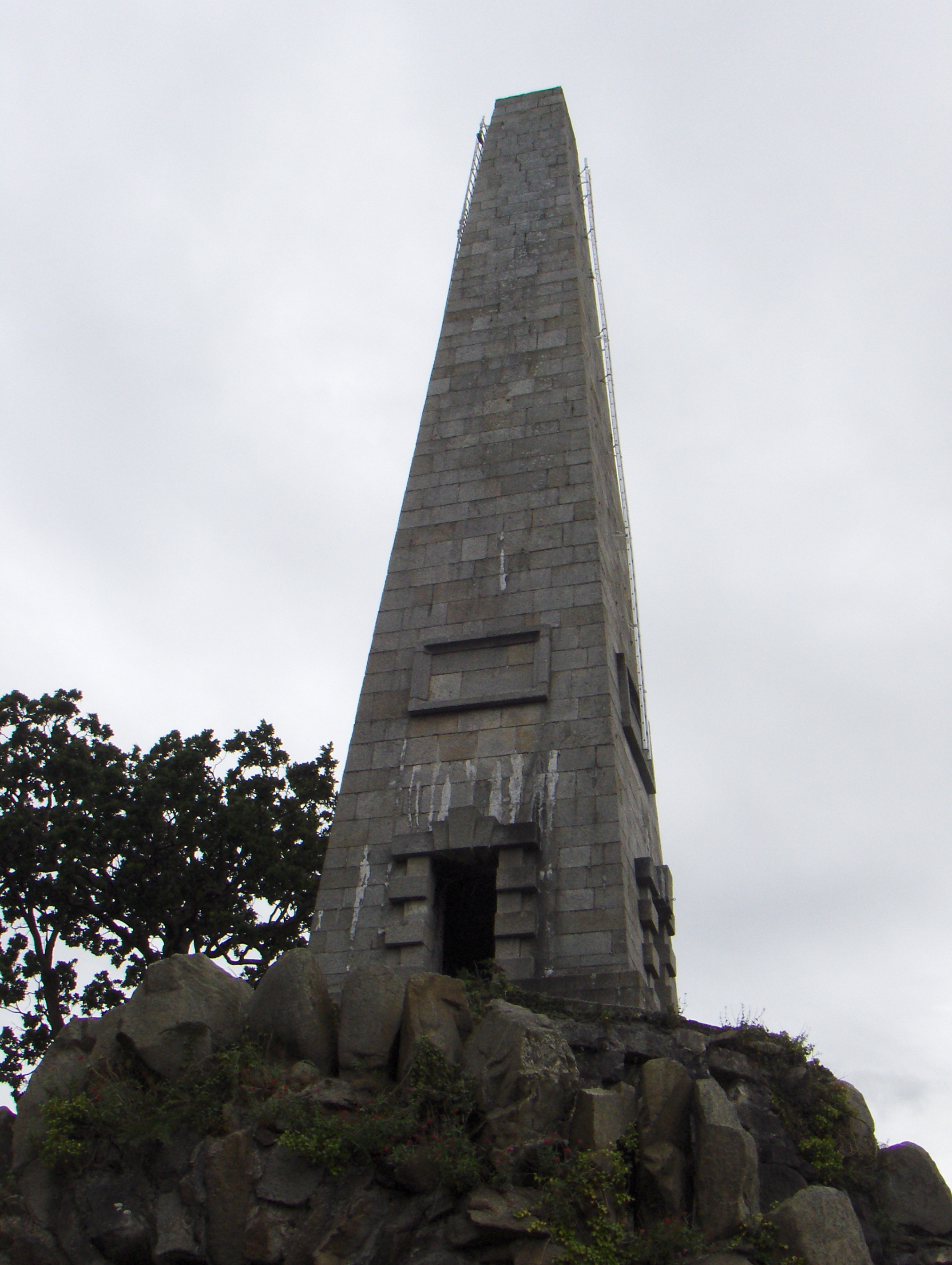
- Tower of the Stillorgan Obelisk

- Location within Dublin
- Location: Carysfort Woods, Carysfort Avenue, Stillorgan
- Coordinates: 53°17′12″N 6°10′53″W
- Designer: Edward Lovett Pearce
- Type: Obelisk
- Material: Granite, lichen
- Height: Over 100 ft (30 m)
- Completion date: c. 1727
- Dedicated to: Lady Allen
- Website: www.dlrcoco.ie/attraction/stillorgan-obelisk

The Stillorgan Obelisk is an obelisk in Stillorgan, on the Southside of Dublin, Ireland.

== History ==
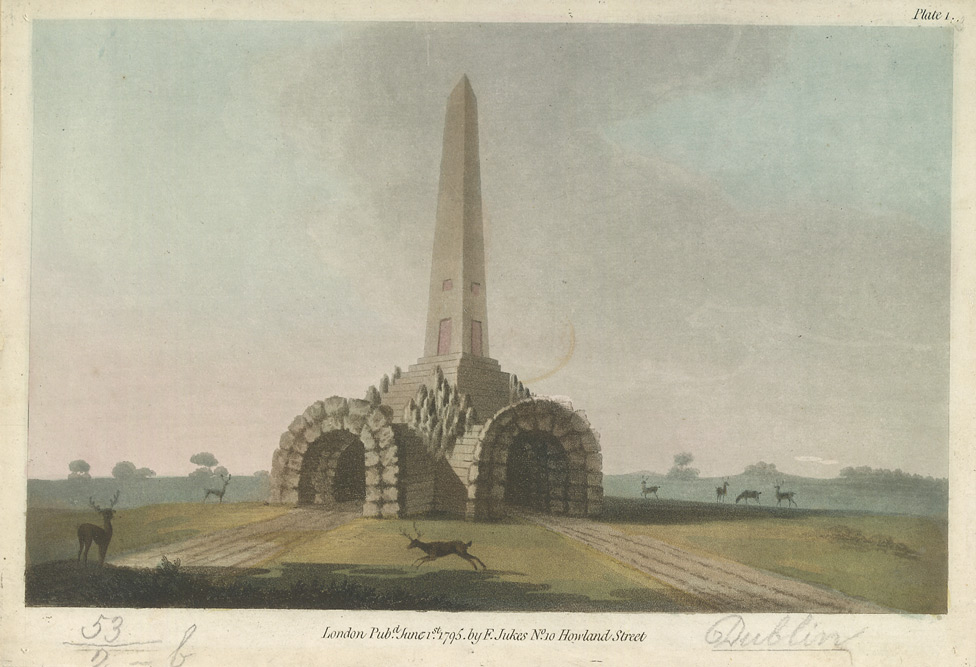
The Obelisk in the Park at Stillorgan by Francis Jukes 1795

The Stillorgan Obelisk was designed by Edward Lovett Pearce and built in Lord Allen (John Allen, 1st Viscount Allen)'s deer park by local labourers at the instigation of Lord Allen in c. 1727, although the exact date is unknown. The obelisk was built as a monument to Lord Allen's wife, Lady Allen, though it may have also been built to provide local employment. In 1831, George Newenham Wright, the Professor of Antiquities to the Royal Hibernian Academy said that the obelisk was built in the 1740s as a form of famine relief during the Irish Famine of 1740 and 1741. Wright also described the obelisk as a "beautiful delicate pyramidal column" that tapers "gracefully to its summit". One of Pearce's drawings has "Lady Allen's burying-place, to be a monument to patience" written on it, although Lady Allen is not buried there.

A cist, tentatively dated to the Early Bronze Age, containing a flint flake and the remains of a young adult female was discovered beside the obelisk in 1954. Combined with previous discoveries, this raised the possibility of a cemetery in the area.

In September 2007, journalist Tim O'Brien writing for The Irish Times reported that the obelisk was undergoing restoration as part of a scheme by Dún Laoghaire–Rathdown County Council.

== Design ==
The Stillorgan Obelisk was inspired by the Fontana dei Quattro Fiumi by Gian Lorenzo Bernini in the Piazza Navona in Rome, Italy, though the Stillorgan obelisk is rustic, while the Fontana dei Quattro Fiumi is figurative. The Irish Independent says that it is "thought to be" the first obelisk in Ireland, while Dún Laoghaire–Rathdown County Council says that it is probably the first, and Dublin City Library and Archive says that it is the "first of its kind". The Stillorgan Obelisk consists of an obelisk on a groin vault base containing a grotto. It is over one hundred feet high, with the obelisk being made of cut granite, while the base is made of uncut rock that is covered with lichen.

== Gallery ==
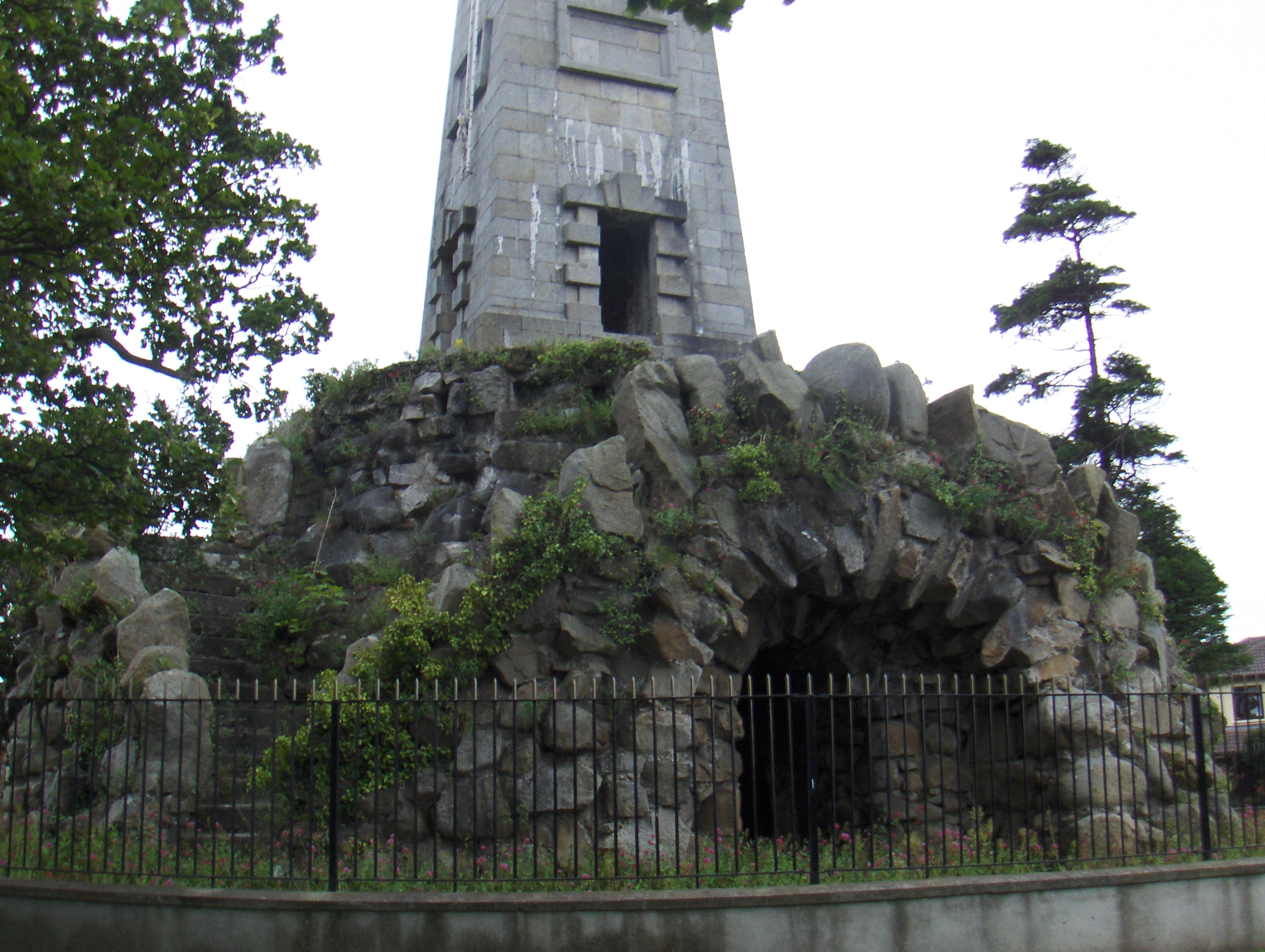
Base of the Stillorgan Obelisk

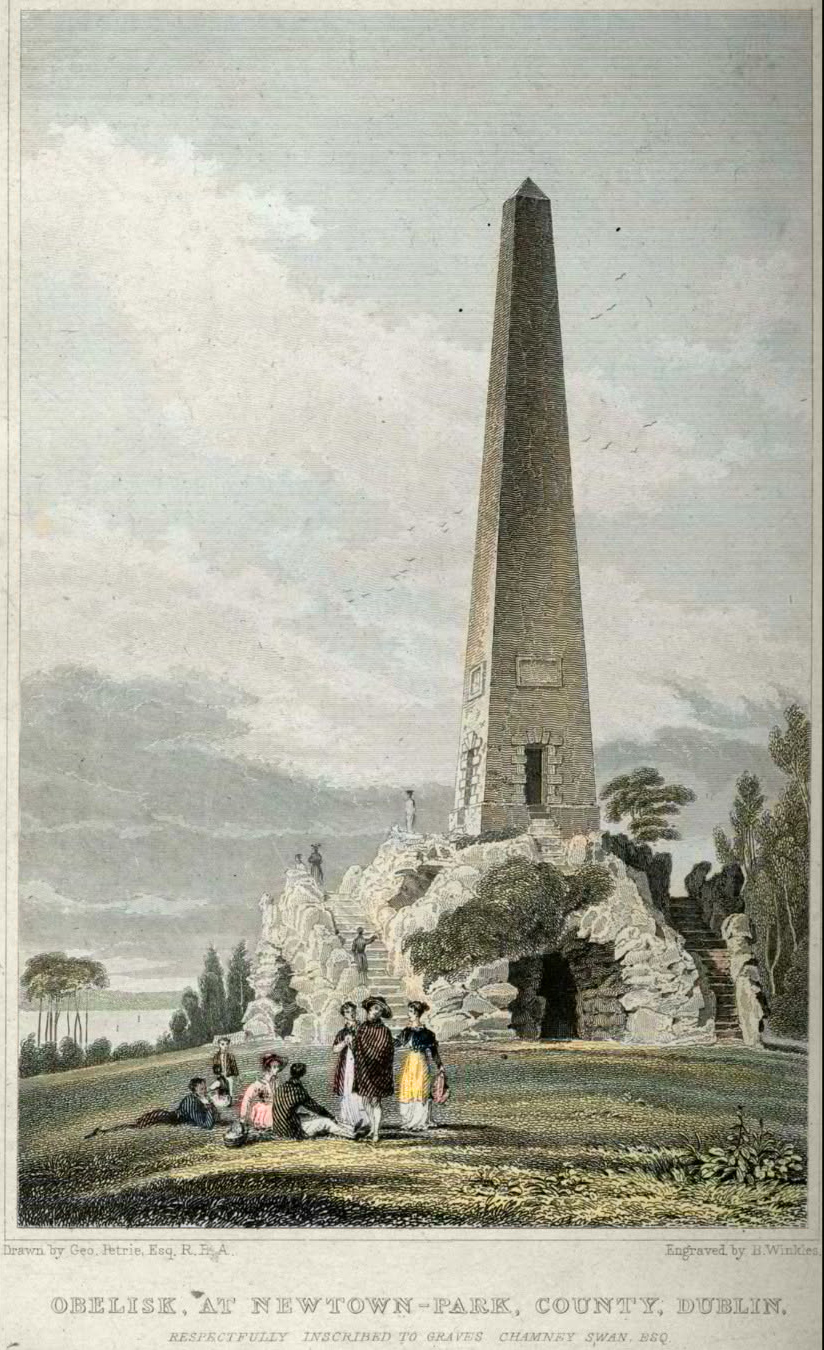
Obelisk at Newton Park, County Dublin by Geo. Petrie, Esq. R. B. A.

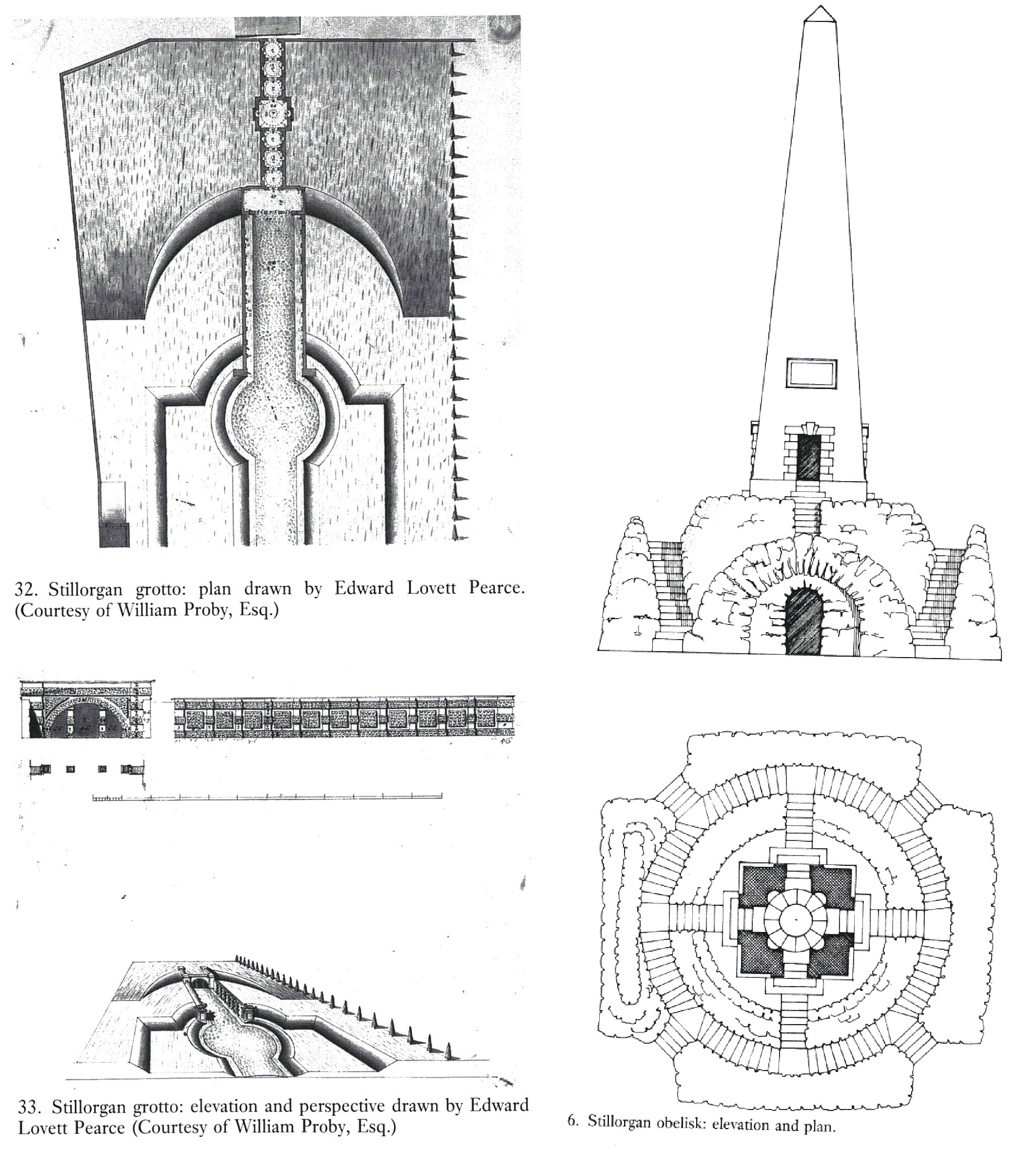
Drawings of the Stillorgan obelisk by Edward Lovett Pearce
