= Rockcorry =

Rockcorry Buíochar
- Village
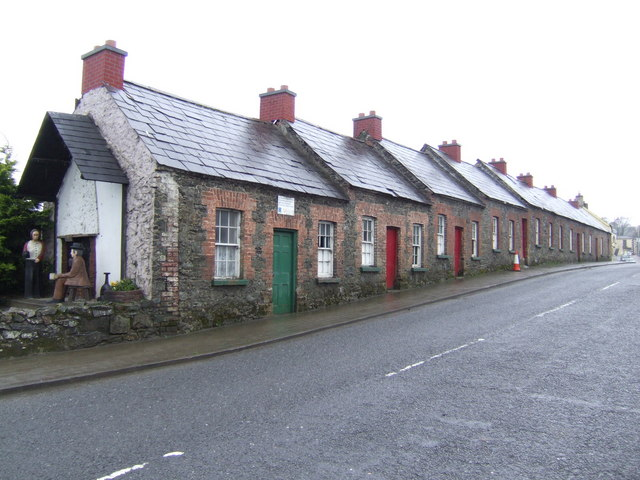
- Rockcorry, mill-workers cottages

- Location in Ireland
- Coordinates: 54°07′N 7°01′W
- Country: Ireland
- Province: Ulster
- County: County Monaghan
- Barony: Dartree

Population (2016)
  - Total: 416

Rockcorry (Irish: Buíochar) historically known as Boyher, is a village and townland in County Monaghan, Ireland. The village is near Dartrey Forest on the R188 (which links Cootehill to Monaghan town).

== History ==
Rockcorry was originally built as a market town by the Corry family, in the townland of Boyher. The ruin of an old stone-built brewery and mill can be seen on the outskirts of the village. Rockcorry Market House was built in 1835 by Thomas C. Steuart Corry. It is a simple, almost square building of two stories and three bays. There is a tall central arch in each facade. On the main front, the central bay breaks forward slightly and is topped by a pediment. Cornet Walter Corry built the town of Newtowncorry, later renamed Rockcorry, and the now vanished Rockcorry Castle. The current Main Street of the village was built in the 1840s.

According to the Introduction to the Dartrey Papers (published by PRONI in Belfast), part of the Fairfield Estate, the Corry family's country estate that included Rockcorry, was bought in 1831 for the 3rd Baron Cremorne (1817–1897), the young head of the Dawson family of neighbouring Dartrey. Most of the rest of the Fairfield Estate was later bought in 1840 by the young Lord Cremorne (later created Earl of Dartrey in 1866). Cremorne (later known as Lord Dartrey) would go on to become a prominent Liberal (and, later, Liberal Unionist) politician. The Fairfield Estate was added on to the vast Dartrey Estate, centred on Dawson Grove (remodelled and greatly enlarged in the 1840s as Dartrey Castle). Thus, the village of Rockcorry also changed ownership at that time, now being owned by the Dawson family.

The Dawson Monument, a neo-classical column designed by James Wyatt and erected around 1808, still stands on the Cootehill/Rockcorry road in memory of Richard Dawson, MP, who died in 1807. It was erected by the 'independent' voters of County Monaghan in praise of their member of the Irish House of Commons and, following the Act of Union, member of the British House of Commons. Richard 'Honest Dick' Dawson voted against the Act of Union and was suspected of radical sympathies during the period of the United Irishmen.

== Transport ==
Rockcorry is not served by rail services, as Rockcorry railway station (which opened in 1860) closed for passenger and goods traffic on 10 March 1947 and closed altogether on 20 June 1955.

Bus routes which serve the village include Bus Éireann route 175, which operates daily linking Rockcorry with Monaghan, Cootehill and Cavan. There are four journeys each way Mondays to Fridays inclusive and two in each direction on Saturdays and Sundays.

== People ==
- John Robert Gregg, a pioneer of shorthand writing, grew up in Rockcorry.

== See also ==
- List of towns and villages in Ireland
- Market Houses in Ireland
