= Donnybrook Cemetery =

Cemetery in Dublin, Ireland

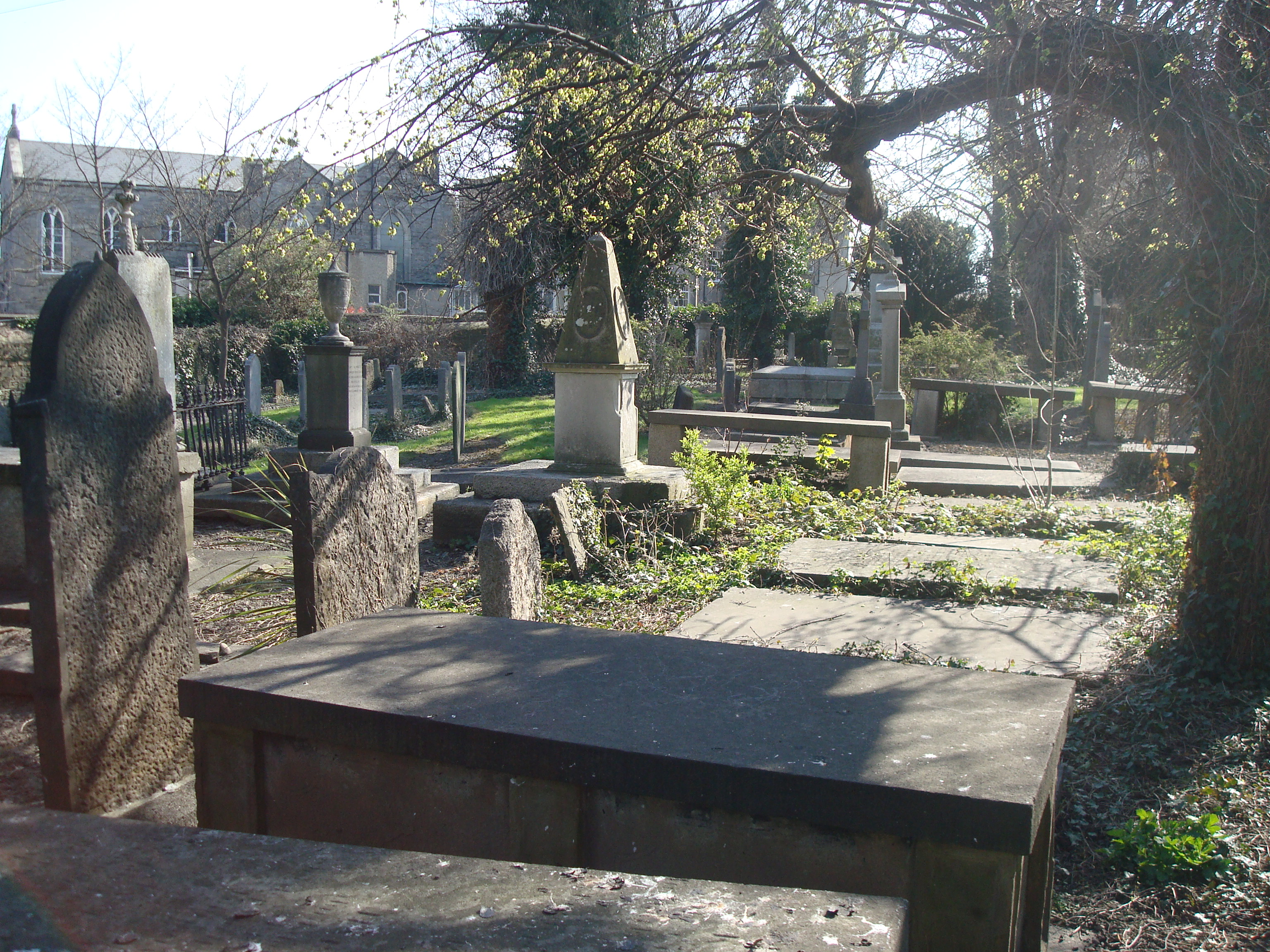
- Interactive map of Donnybrook Cemetery

Details
- Established: c. AD 800
- Location: Donnybrook Road, Donnybrook, Dublin
- Country: Ireland
- Coordinates: 53°19′17″N 6°14′09″W
- Type: Christian churchyard
- Size: 0.26 hectares (0.64 acres)
- No. of interments: 7,000+
- Find a Grave: Donnybrook Cemetery

Donnybrook Cemetery (Irish: Reilig Dhomhnach Broc) is located close to the River Dodder in Donnybrook, Dublin, Ireland. The cemetery was the location of an old Celtic church founded by Saint Broc and later a church dedicated to St. Mary. The site has been in use between 800 and 1880 with the exception of some burial rights.

== History ==
The site was once the location of an old Celtic church founded by Saint Broc which lends its name to Donnybrook (Irish: Domhnach Broc).

Later the church of St. Mary was dedicated by the Archbishop of Dublin, Archbishop John Comyn sometime between 1181 and 1212. The church was rebuilt by Archbishop William King in 1720 and by 1827, due to the size of the congregation, a replacement protestant church was built on the corner of Anglesea Road and Simmonscourt Road and named St. Mary's Church, Donnybrook in 1830.

The old church was later demolished and the materials sold off. There is a small wall in the middle of the cemetery that is thought to be the remains of the old church.

The entrance to the cemetery was originally located to the south where the Religious Sisters of Charity are located. Today the entrance is beside the Garda station and is through an archway that was erected by the Dublin Stock Exchange in 1893 in memory of Thomas Chamney Searight.

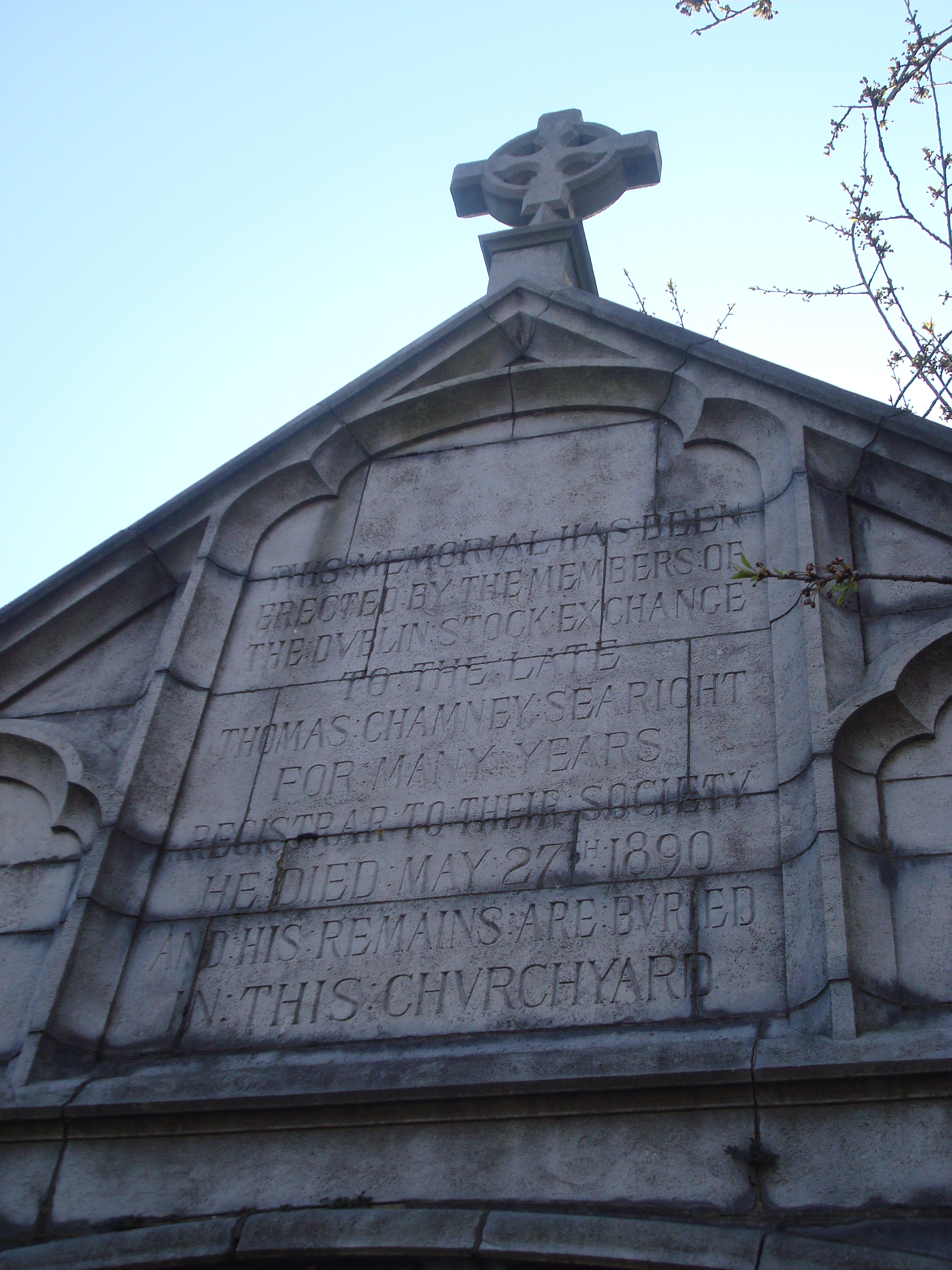
The plaque on the archway above the entrance to Donnybrook Cemetery

The archway serves as a plaque and reads,

This memorial has been erected by the members of the Dublin Stock Exchange to the late Thomas Chamney Searight for many years the registrar to their society. He died May 27th 1890 and his remains are buried in this churchyard.

In 1847 much needed improvements were made as the cemetery had become neglected.

In 1879 the discovery of the remains of 600 people was made at a mound on Ailesbury Road which dated back to a bloody massacre by the Danes in the 9th to 10th century. The bodies were removed and buried in the cemetery.

In 1931 when the street was widened and the entrance was moved back approximately fifteen feet, a mass grave was discovered. The bodies were reburied in the south of the cemetery.

On 1 May 1976 the president of Ireland Cearbhall Ó Dálaigh opened the cemetery after a cleanup.

In 1985 a major programme of restoration was undertaken by the Donnybrook Community Development Committee availing of the Social Employment Scheme. The DCDC was an initiative of local people Dermot Lacey, Lar Kelly and Tony Boyle. In addition to the restoration works which lasted three years the committee also compiled a comprehensive list of burials and published a number of historical accounts of the Cemetery. In 1988 the work of the staff and Committee was marked with a visit and unveiling of a new Information case and noticeboard by then Lord Mayor of Dublin Carmencita Hedderman.

The cemetery is under to care of Dublin City Council but the gates are locked, but the key can be obtained from the Garda station next door.

== Notable burials ==
=== FitzWilliam family ===
The FitzWilliam family had their own chapel built onto St. Mary's Church in the early 16th century. Sir Richard FitzWilliam was interred in the cemetery in 1595 and Nicholas FitzWilliam in 1635. The 1st Earl of Tyrconnell and 2nd Viscount FitzWilliam was buried under a tomb of black marble in the family chapel with the inscription,

Here lyeth the Body of the Right Honourable And most Noble LORD OLIVER, Earl of Tyrconell, lord Viscount FITZ_WILLIAMS, or Meryonge, Baron of Thorn-Castle, who died at his House in Meryong April 11th 1667, and was Buried the 12th day of the same month.

The 6th Viscount FitzWilliam died on 25 May 1776 and was interred in the family chapel. The family tomb is missing from the cemetery.

=== Religious figures ===
There are a few notable religious figures buried here such as,

- Archbishop William King (1650–1729), Archbishop of Dublin
- Bishop Robert Clayton (1695–1758), Bishop of Clogher
- Rev. Richard Graves (1763–1829), theological scholar and the author of the classic in its time, Graves on the Pentateuch
- Rev. George Wogan (died 1826), curate of the Donnybrook parish murdered in his house in Spafield Place near Ballsbridge. Later on the evening of his murder, two bandits were apprehended for a highway robbery on the Blackrock Road and confessed to the murder and were hanged.
- Rev. Arthur Gore Ryder (died 1889), rector of Donnybrook; many years later the last two burials in Donnybrook were his two sisters Elizabeth (1935) and Amy (1936).

=== Other notable burials ===
- Edward Lovett Pearce (1699–1733), Irish architect
- Bartholomew Mosse (1712–1759), Irish surgeon and impresario responsible for founding the Rotunda Hospital in Dublin
- William Ashford (1746–1824), British painter who worked exclusively in Ireland
- Dr. Richard Robert Madden (1798–1886), Irish doctor, writer, abolitionist and historian of the United Irishmen. He is buried here with his father and other members of his family.
- Leonard McNally (1752–1820), informer
