= Gloster House =

Georgian house in County Offaly, Ireland

- Glasdoire Mór
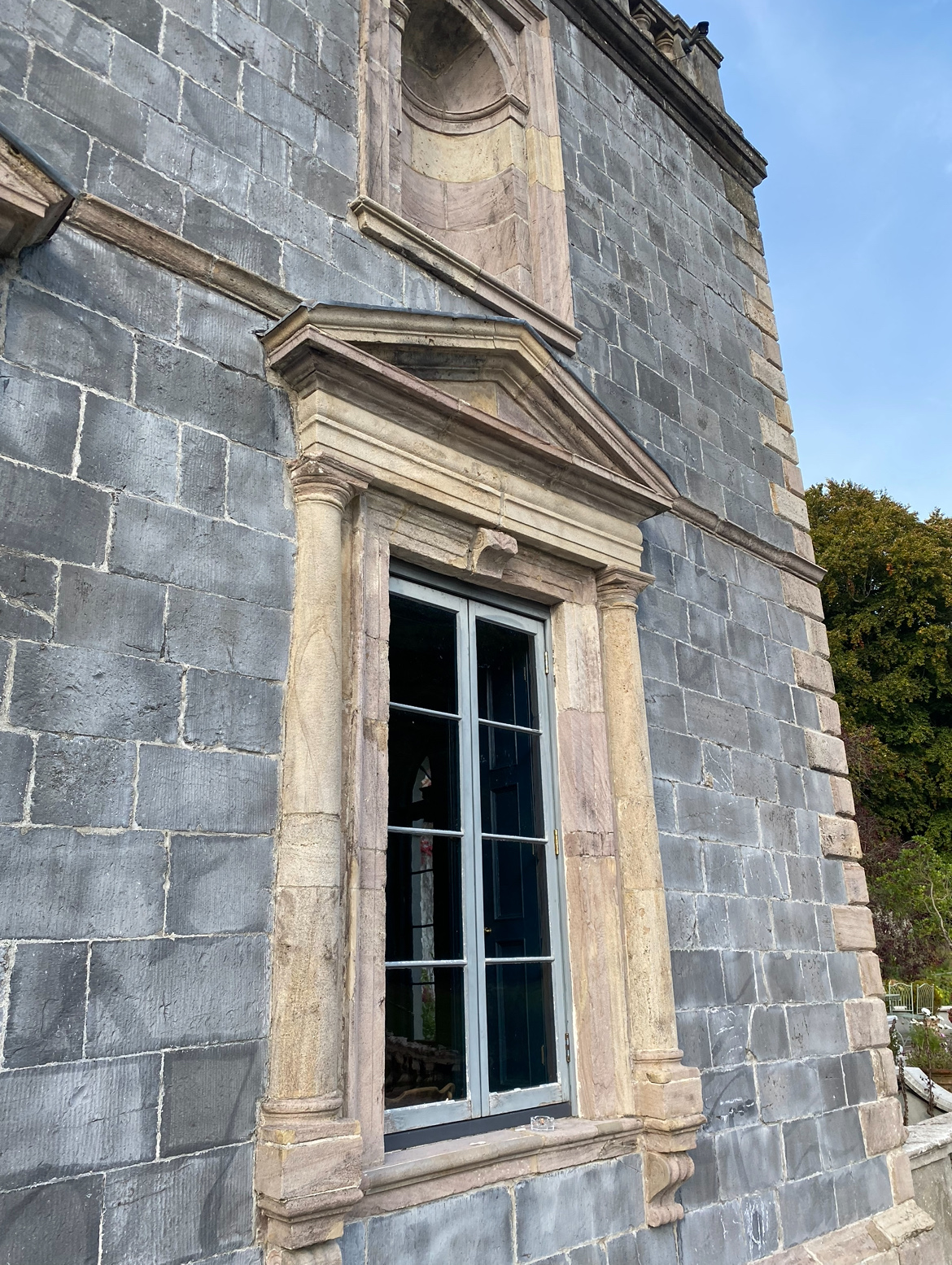
- Window architraves (bottom) and niche (top) in dressed sandstone

- Location within Ireland

General information
- Status: Wedding and events venue
- Type: House
- Architectural style: Palladian
- Location: Brosna, County Offaly, Ireland
- Coordinates: 53.00232°N 7.87449°W
- Estimated completion: 1720
- Renovated: 1780
- Owner: Tom and Mary Alexander

Technical details
- Material: limestone ashlar walls and sandstone dressings and detailing, red brick chimneys
- Floor count: 2

Design and construction
- Architect: Edward Lovett Pearce
- Developer: Trevor Lloyd and earlier the Medhop Family

Website
- www.glosterhouse.ie

Gloster House is a Georgian-Palladian country house operating as a wedding venue near Brosna, County Offaly, Ireland. The design of the house has sometimes been attributed to the architect Edward Lovett Pearce who was a cousin of the owner, Trevor Lloyd, at the time the main house was constructed around 1720 – although no firm evidence of this survives.

The house continued to be owned and occupied by the Lloyd family until 1958 when it was sold to the Salesian order to house a school and nursing home. The house changed hands again twice in the 1990s and, having deteriorated over time, was purchased by the current owners in 2001 and subsequently restored.

The English sounding name of the property and townland 'Gloster' (phonically identical to Gloucester) has its origins in an anglicized version of the name of the original townland, Glasderrymore (Irish: Glasdoire Mór – big green oak wood).

== House and interior ==
The original main house is a detached 13-bay, 2-storey over basement property constructed almost entirely in the Georgian era, with the initial house taking shape around 1720 before major extension works took place around 1780 to provide for an additional three-bay breakfront and recessed flanking bays. The house, which has sandstone dressings and ornamentation, is described in the National Inventory of Architectural Heritage as being less austere and more "playful" than other Georgian houses of the era.

The main house was constructed in limestone ashlar with sandstone dressing ornamentation and architrave surrounds and pediments as well as fluted pilasters, plinth course, string course, quoins and parapet with balustrade. The window surrounds also contain carved mascarons while the main door frame includes a carved crest of the Lloyd family.

The interior of the property contains a double height entrance hall with original pieces of Georgian stucco work. Niches contain marbles and plaster busts while an arcaded balcony over looks the hall and links by a barrel vaulted corridor to other upstairs rooms in the house.

The contents of the house were also sold in their entirety in an auction over three days from Tuesday 28 October 1958. A number of items, including original fireplaces and paintings, were stripped from the building.

=== Gloster arch folly ===
The Gloster arch folly in the grounds of the house, which is also attributed to Edward Lovett Pearce, was constructed in limestone rubble and lime mortar and includes a pedimented archway and flanking obelisks on plinths. It and was constructed at the same time as the initial house around 1730. The structure was restored with the help of the Folly Trust in 2018 when the ivy was removed and now sits at the end of a vista from the house.

== History ==
=== Medhop and Lloyd families ===
King Charles I granted the lands at Glasderrymore to the Medhop (or Midhop) family some time in the early 1600s. The name of the area was anglicised as Gloster around this time.

There are records of the Lloyd family living at Gloster since 1639 when Trevor Lloyd married Margaret Rose Medhop. Further lands were assigned to the Lloyd family, in 1666, following the English Restoration. In 1696, their son Medhop Lloyd married Hannah Lovett, daughter of Christopher Lovett, a former Lord Mayor of Dublin and had 14 children including Trevor Lloyd.

A house was originally constructed in the 17th century on the site. Some historians, including Maurice Craig, believe but that it was almost entirely rebuilt in its current form around 1720 by Trevor Lloyd III, whose cousin, the architect Edward Lovett Pearce, was likely engaged to assist in the design of a grander and more fashionable Georgian Palladian-style residence. The house was again further extended and embellished around 1780 while the Lloyd family continued to live in the same house for the next 180 years.

In the early 1780s, Colonel Hardress Lloyd is recorded as being born at the house as the eldest son of John Lloyd MP for King's County.

In 1797, John Lloyd's daughter Alice married Lawrence Parsons, 2nd Earl of Rosse of nearby Birr Castle.

=== Sale to the Salesian order ===
In 1958, the house was sold to the Salesian order by the Major Evan T. Trevor Lloyd and the main house was converted into a convent and nursing home while modern school buildings were constructed in the grounds to the rear and many of the old farm buildings were demolished. The contents of the house were also sold off at auction.

The house and buildings operated as a secondary school mainly for female borders but closed in 1990. Shortly thereafter the house fell into further disrepair.

=== Macra na Feirme ownership ===
The house was acquired by Macra na Feirme in 1991 and was briefly under its management before it was sold.

=== Edward Haughey ownership ===
The businessman and politician, Edward Haughey, Baron Ballyedmond bought the house in 1993. Few changes or improvements were made to the property during his period of ownership.

=== Wedding venue ===
In 2001, the house was purchased by Tom and Mary Alexander who slowly restored the house and converted it into a wedding and events venue over a period of a decade.

== Notable visitors ==
John Wesley was recorded as preaching at the house on Tuesday 13 June 1749. Of his visit, which took place during a tour of Ireland, Wesley reputedly wrote of the "splendour" of the house.

Nellie Melba performed at the house, in the early 20th century, during a visit to Ireland.

== See also ==
- Birr Castle
- Charleville Castle
- Damer House
- Kinnitty Castle
- Leap Castle
