= Brosna, County Offaly =

Village in County Offaly, Ireland

Brosna An Bhrosnach
- Village
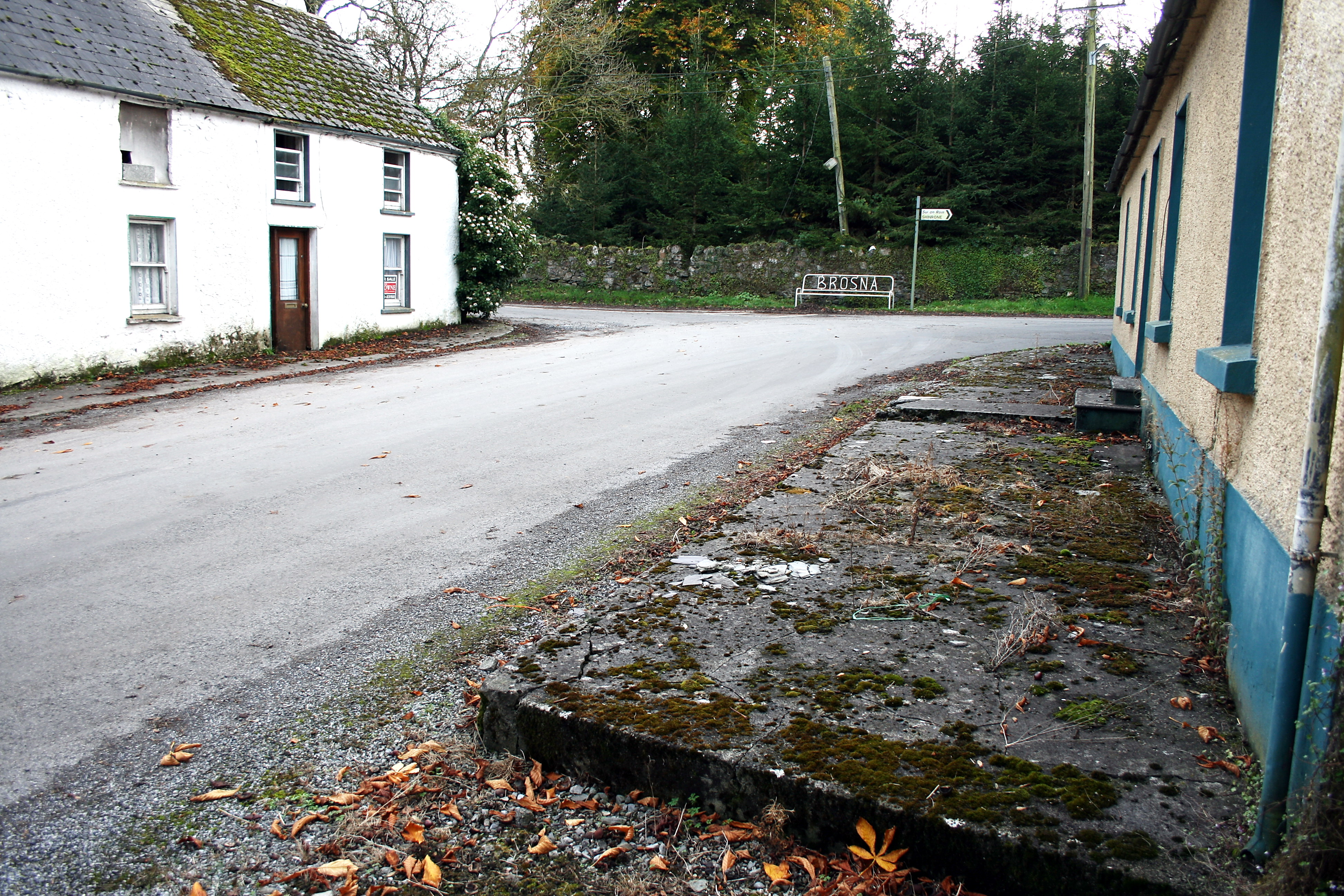
- Brosna, County Offaly

- Location in Ireland
- Coordinates: 52.9913°N 7.8881°W
- Country: Ireland
- Province: Leinster
- County: Offaly
- Time zone: UTC+0 (WET)
  - Summer (DST): UTC-1 (IST (WEST))

Brosna (Irish: An Bhrosnach) is a small village and townland in County Offaly, Ireland. 7 km north-west of Roscrea, it lies in the valley of the Little Brosna River near the N62 road. The area takes its name from the Little Brosna River, which flows along the north-eastern edge of the townland. As of the 2011 census, Brosna townland had a population of 31 people.

== Architecture ==
Brosna House, an early 19th-century two-storey house located at the roadside, is listed as being of architectural interest. A late 19th-century cast iron water pump also stands in the village.

Gloster House hotel and wedding venue is also located in the area.

== See also ==
- List of towns and villages in Ireland
