= Christopher Lovett =

Lord Mayor of Dublin (1630–1680)

Lord Mayor of Dublin
- In office 1676–1677
- Preceded by: William Smith
- Succeeded by: John Smith

Personal details
- Born: 1630 Soulbury, Buckinghamshire, England
- Died: 1680 (aged 49–50) Dublin
- Spouse: Frances O'Moore

Christopher Lovett (1630–1680) was a linen merchant and manufacturer who was Lord Mayor of Dublin from 1676 to 1677.

== Background ==
He was born in 1630 the 5th son of Sir Robert Lovett (died 1643), of Liscome House near Soulbury, Buckinghamshire and Anne Saunders of Dinton, Buckinghamshire. Robert was High Sheriff of Buckinghamshire in 1608.

In July 1646, Christopher was apprenticed for eight years by his widowed mother to Robert Molesworth, a draper of London. At some stage he transferred his apprenticeship to his second master Roger Lambert and was with him when he attained his freedman status as a citizen of London on 15 March 1653.

He married Frances O'Moore (died 1715) daughter of Pierce O'Moore and a relation of Rory O'Moore of Queens County at the Church of St. John the Evangelist, Dublin on 7 May 1657, the church having an association with the Guild of Tailors. He lived first at Wood Quay before moving to Blind Quay (now Lower Exchange Street) from around 1660.

He was chiefly a linen merchant and manufacturer who gained experience trading in modern-day Turkey and later moved to Ireland in the mid to late 1650s. He is recorded as being a freeman of the city of Dublin in 1655. He is later recorded as paying quarterage by the drapers in Dublin in 1663 meaning he had not been admitted to one of the Guilds of the City of Dublin. He was elected Sheriff of Dublin City in 1665.

He was elected alderman and Lord Mayor of Dublin in the same year 1676 when he is also recorded as leasing a linen factory near Chapelizod.

He died in 1680, and was buried at St. Michan's Church, Dublin.

== Descendants ==
He had at least seven daughters including:

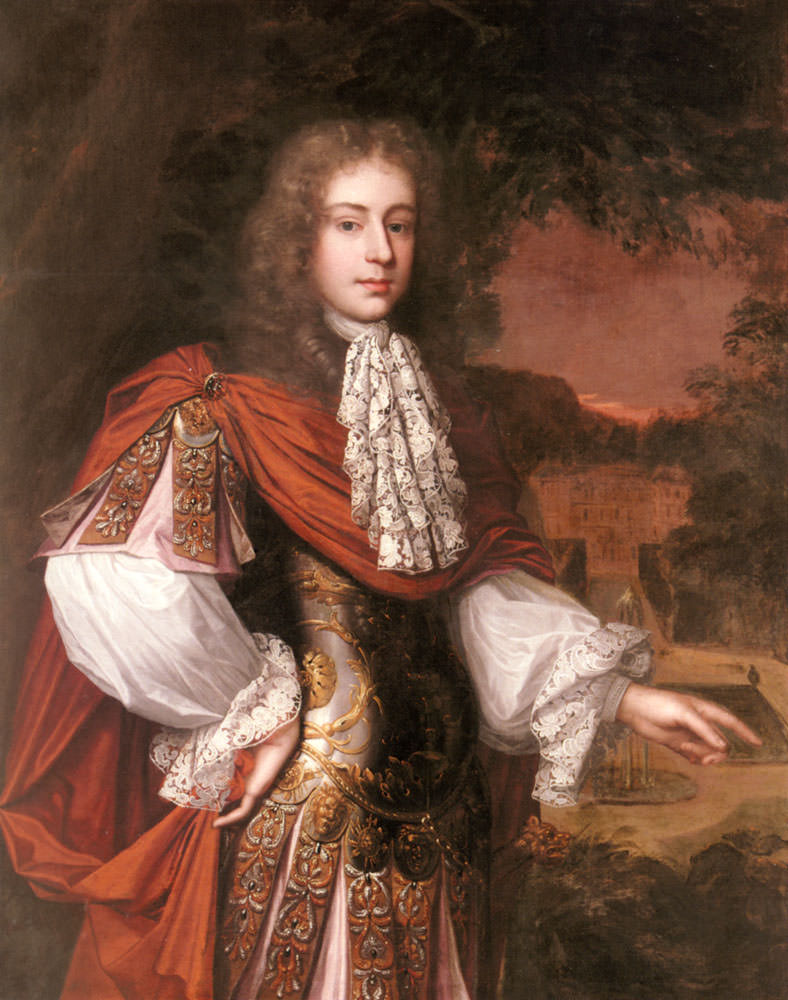
Portrait of William Tighe 1st husband of Anne Lovett, by Thomas Pooley.

- Elizabeth (baptised 1663), died in infancy
- Mary, died in infancy
- Anne, married firstly William Tighe (1657–1681) in 1674 and had at least 2 children and later Thomas Coote with whom she had nine children
- Hannah/Mary, who married Medhop Lloyd of Gloster House in 1696 and had 14 children
- Rebeckah (baptised 1674)
- Arabella (baptised 1676)
- Frances Lovett, who married General Edward Pearce and whose son was the noted architect Edward Lovett Pearce.

He also had at least four sons including:

- Christopher (baptised 1658), his eldest son who inherited the estates in Buckinghamshire under entail from his cousin
- Colonel John (baptised 1668)
- Francis (baptised 1670)
- Edward (baptised 1678), became a barrister.

Civic offices
Preceded by William Smith	Lord Mayor of Dublin; 1676–1677	Succeeded by John Smith
