= Dartrey Forest =

Historic estate on the Cavan-Monaghan border, Ireland

Dartrey Estate
- Dartraighe
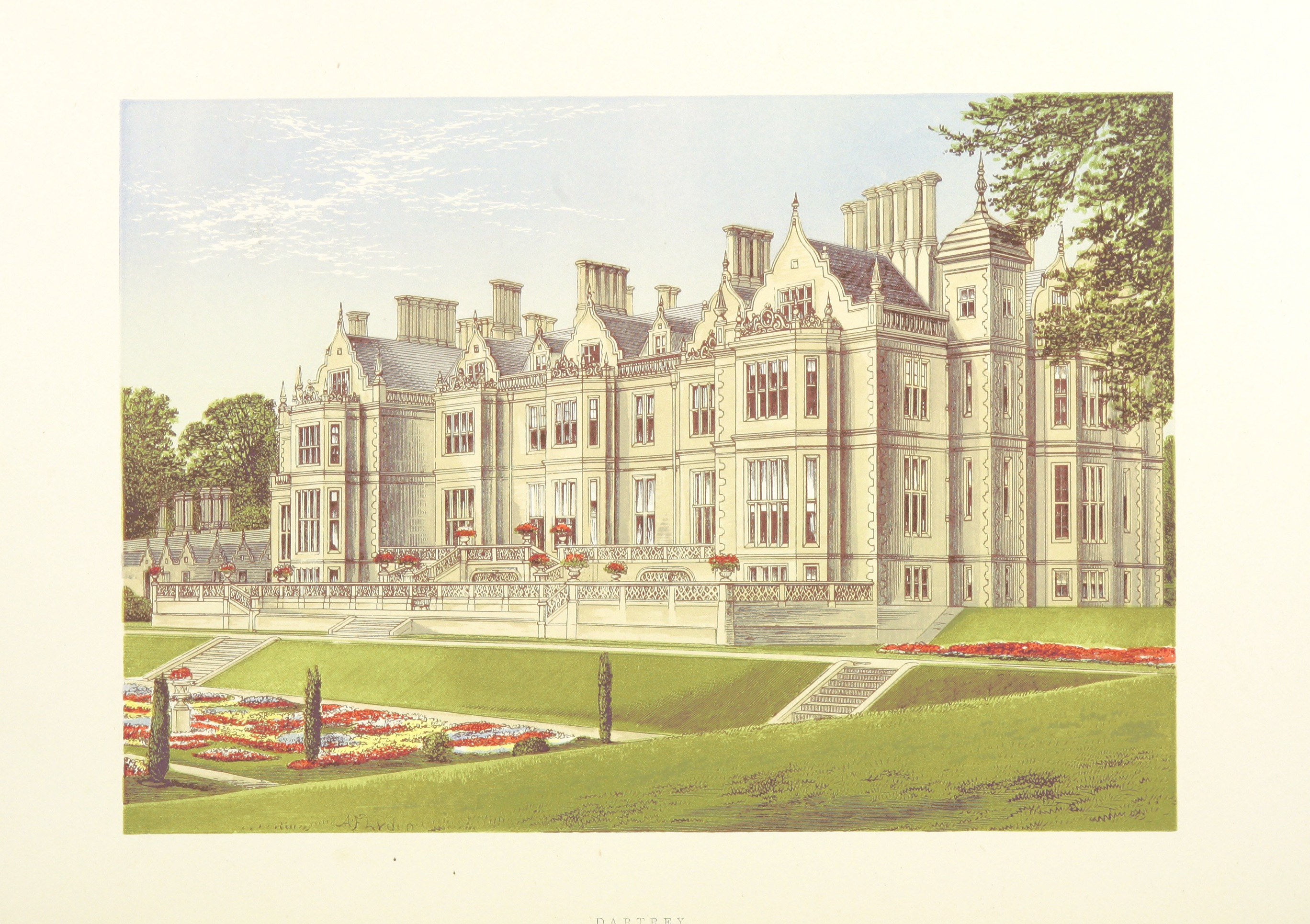

- Location within Ireland
- Alternative names: Dawson Grove Estate

General information
- Status: Private dwelling house
- Type: House
- Architectural style: Jacobethan
- Classification: Demolished
- Location: Rockcorry, Ireland
- Coordinates: 54.0986°N 7.0716°W
- Completed: 1846
- Demolished: 1950

Design and construction
- Architect: William Burn

Dartrey Heritage

Dartrey Forest (sometimes Dartrey Estate or Dawson Grove Estate) is a forest and estate near Rockcorry in north-west County Monaghan, Ireland. It was formerly part of the Barony of Dartrey and was the country estate of the Dawson family, who had the title Earl of Dartrey from 1866 to 1933.

The once vast estate was centred on Dartrey House which was demolished in 1946. The forest's main gate is only a few miles from Cootehill. It is currently managed by Coillte as a commercial forest. The Forest is partially bordered by what is known locally as 'the Famine Wall', which stretches halfway along the road from Cootehill to Rockcorry (the R188). Just across the R188, the main Cootehill to Rockcorry road, near the main gate into the forest, is the Dawson Monument, a fine neo-Classical column designed by James Wyatt and erected around 1808. The column, just outside the forest, stands on the roadside.

The landscape of the forest and surrounding area is particularly beautiful, being composed of a series of lakes joined by the Dromore River. A description from 1844 states "the banks of the Cootehill (Dromore) River, for several miles above the town, furnish a constant series of very rich close landscapes, chiefly of the class which may be designated languishingly beautiful." The lakes have a number of crannógs which provided traditional fortification until, possibly, the late 16th century and perhaps helped facilitate trade with settlements up stream.

== Black Island and The Mausoleum ==
Between the lakes is Black Island, a large island of considerable beauty, where a building, known locally as The 'Temple' or The Mausoleum and more formally as the Dawson Mausoleum is located. The mausoleum is of significant architectural importance, especially within an Irish context. Alas, the structure has suffered much decay over the years. Designed by James Wyatt in 1770, it is modelled on the Pantheon in Rome and is, according to John R. Redmill, DipArch, FRIAI, RIBA, a leading Irish architectural conservationist, "one of the most important 18th century buildings in Ireland". Although roofless for the last 40 years, historic preservation and restoration efforts are now being undertaken by the local Dartrey Heritage Association. (see link below for image of Temple) Although built as a mausoleum in fact it houses no remains yet still it remains a monument to universal grief and loss.

Black Island is connected with the mainland, western shore of the Inner Lough by the Iron Bridge, a fine iron structure that badly needs restoration.

== Dartrey Castle and Church ==
Dartrey Forest today largely covers the former demesne (or 'park') that surrounded Dartrey Castle (also known as Dartrey House or Dawson Grove), a neo-Elizabethan country house largely constructed in the 1840s, during part of the Great Famine in Ireland. The castle was at the centre of the once vast Dartrey Estate (also known as the Dawson Grove Estate). The mansion was designed by William Burn, the famous British architect, for The 3rd Baron Cremorne (later created The 1st Earl of Dartrey).

The early Victorian house was built for young Lord Cremorne on the site of Dawson Grove, the old late 18th century neo-Classical country house that stood in the demesne. The old house dated from the 1770s. Lord Cremorne, who later became a prominent Liberal (and, later, Liberal Unionist) politician, had the old Dawson Grove remodelled and greatly enlarged to create a virtual new house.

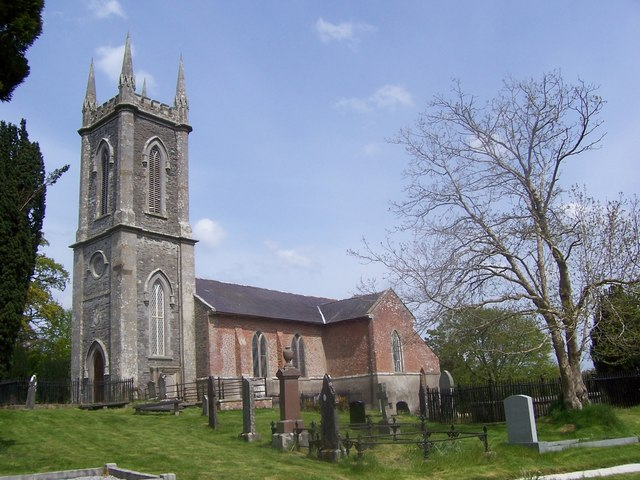
Dartrey Church of St. John the Evangelist

The new 'castle' stood on the western shore of the Inner Lough, a lake separated from Dromore Lough by Black Island. According to the Introduction to the Dartrey Papers (which can be viewed online) held at P.R.O.N.I. in Belfast, a fire destroyed part of the newly remodelled house in March 1856. After this, the house was again rebuilt in the neo-Elizabethan (or, indeed, 'Jacobethan') style. Most of the contents of the castle were sold off in 1937. Dartrey Castle, one of Ireland's best known country houses, was demolished in 1946. Only the castle's old stables, and part of the old farmyard, remain.

Quite near the site of the castle, on the edge of the old demesne, is the Church of St. John the Evangelist (better known simply as Dartrey Church), the neo-Gothic Church of Ireland estate church built at the edge of the townland of Kilcrow. This church, which was originally built in the late 1720s and early 1730s, and partially rebuilt throughout the 19th century, remains in use to the present day.

== Dartrey Kingdom ==
The location was once part of the wider region of Dartrey (Dartraighe, Dartraige Coininnsi, Dairtre, Dartree, Dartry) Kingdom which stretched north to Clones, belonging to the McMahons and O'Boylans. The name is derived from the Dartraige, the 'calf people' who were an early Irish tribe that dwelt in and around the area of present-day north County Roscommon, east County Sligo, west County Leitrim and southern County Monaghan. It was a sub-kingdom of the larger federated Kingdom of Airgíalla, which at one stage stretched from Lough Neagh to Lough Erne, but mainly covered what is now County Monaghan and County Louth. The status of the king (and queen) of Airghialla was such that they sat beside the High King at Tara at great gatherings, and his sword was allowed to touch the High Kings hand – a sign of trust. The larger kingdoms territory decreased as the area took on a more ecclesiastical power structure from Armagh and allied with the Northern and Southern Ui Neill who dominated the political sphere serving as High King of Ireland from the Hill of Tara. It was further reduced by the conquest of the Normans in the 12th century. The Book of Rights list the tribes of the Airgíalla in the 5th century and their entitlements from the king of Airgialla. The following poem was composed by the bard Benén to preserve these rights and benefits.

== Benén's Poem ==
1. This difficulty rests upon the descendants of the Collas, the bright host of Liathdruim,
that they do not know the amount of their stipend, from the king of bright Fuaid.

2. Here is the tradition—I shall relate it for you— of the descendants of gentle Cairpre:
learn, people of Fál of the fiana, the handsome stipends of the Airgialla...

16. The king of Dartraige, a flame of valour, is entitled to four bondsmen of great labour,
four swords hard in battle, four horses, and four golden shields...

20. Here is the tradition of the hosts, whom Benén always loved:
it is a great difficulty to all the learned, save him who is expert in testimony.

as Gaeilge (original)

1. In cheist sea for chloind Cholla for sluag luchair Liathdroma
can fis a tuarastail tall ó ríg Fuaid na find-fearand.

2. Atá sund, sloindfed-sa daíb senchos cloindi Cairpri chaím:
cluinid, a lucht Fáil na fian, tuaristla áilli Airgiall.

16. Dligid rí Dartraigi, in daig, ceithri mogaid mórastair,
ceithri claidim chruaidi i cléith, ceithri heich, ceithri hór-scéith.

20. Atá sund senchas na slóg dá tuc grád co bráth Beneón;
acht int í bus treórach teist ar cach n-eólach is ard-cheist.

IN.

== See also ==
- Bellamont House
