= Charles Coote, 1st Earl of Bellomont =

Anglo-Irish politician

The Right Honourable The Earl of Bellomont KB PC(I)
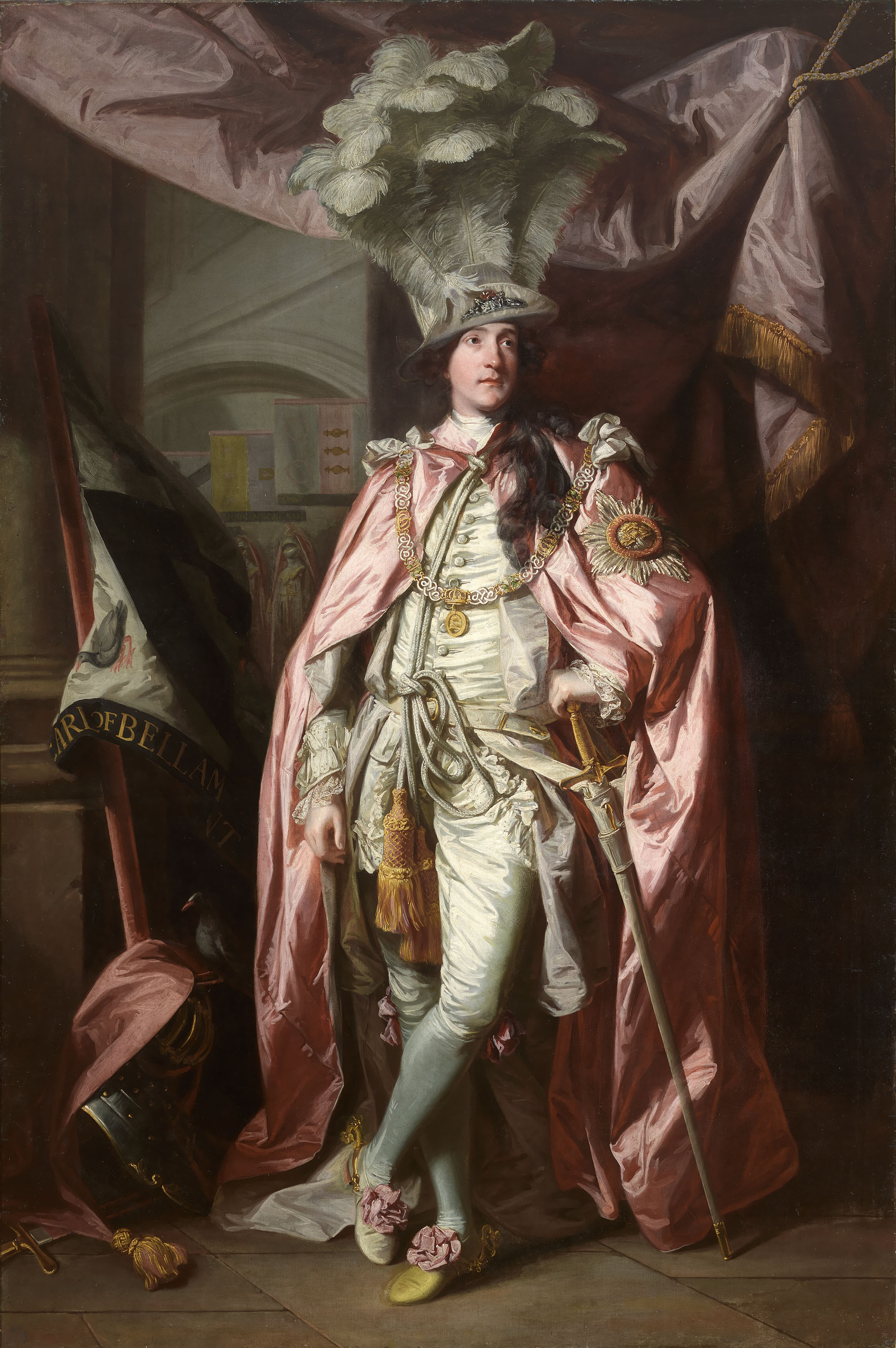
- Portrait by Sir Joshua Reynolds, 1773
- Born: 6 April 1738; Ireland
- Died: 20 October 1800 (aged 62); Dublin, Ireland
- Office: Joint Postmaster General of Ireland
- Spouse: Lady Emily Maria Margaret FitzGerald
- Children: 5
- Parent(s): Charles Coote (1695–1750) and Prudence Geering

Charles Coote, 1st Earl of Bellomont, KB, PC (Ire), (6 April 1738 – 20 October 1800) was an Anglo-Irish politician who served as one of the Postmasters General of Ireland. Charles was briefly styled as the Baron Coote between February 1766 and his elevation to the earldom in September 1767.

== Life ==
Charles was the son of Charles Coote and Prudence Geering of Cootehill, County Cavan. He was born on 6 April 1738 and baptised six days later. He was educated at Trinity College Dublin.

Lord Bellomont, as he then was, was badly wounded while fighting a duel with The Viscount Townshend on 2 February 1773: Townshend shot him in the groin. The quarrel seems to have been political, as Townshend had been a highly unpopular Lord Lieutenant of Ireland.

Coote was the representative for County Cavan in the Irish House of Commons from 1761 to 1766. He succeeded as The 5th Baron Coote in February 1766, and was created Earl of Bellomont in September 1767.

He married Lady Emily Maria Margaret FitzGerald, the daughter of The 1st Duke of Leinster and Emily, Duchess of Leinster, in Blackrock on 20 August 1774. The couple had five children: one son, Charles, who died in 1786, and four daughters, Mary, Prudentia, Emily and Louisa.

Between 1789 and 1797, Lord Bellomont was one of the joint Postmasters General of Ireland with The 1st Marquess of Ely.

His titles became extinct at his death.

== Speeches ==
- Charles Coote Earl of Bellamont (1789). Earl of Bellamont's Speeches, in the House of Lords, on Friday the 13th and Monday the 16th February, 1789. Dublin: P Byrne. OCLC 228671162.

Parliament of Ireland
| Preceded by Hon. Barry Maxwell; Hon. Brinsley Butler | Member of Parliament for County Cavan; 1761–1766; With: Hon. Brinsley Butler | Succeeded by Hon. Brinsley Butler; William Stewart |
Political offices
| Preceded by The Viscount Clifden; William Ponsonby | Postmaster General of Ireland; 1789–1797; With: The Earl of Ely | Succeeded by The Earl of Ely; The Marquess of Drogheda |
Honorary titles
| Unknown | Custos Rotulorum of Cavan; 1780–1800 | Succeeded by Nathaniel Sneyd |
Peerage of Ireland
| New creation | Earl of Bellomont; 1767–1800 | Extinct |
| Preceded by Richard Coote | Baron Coote; 1766–1800 | Extinct |
Baronetage of Ireland
| New creation | Baronet (of Donnybrooke); 1774–1800 | Succeeded by Charles Coote |
