= Earl of Bellomont =

Irish peerage

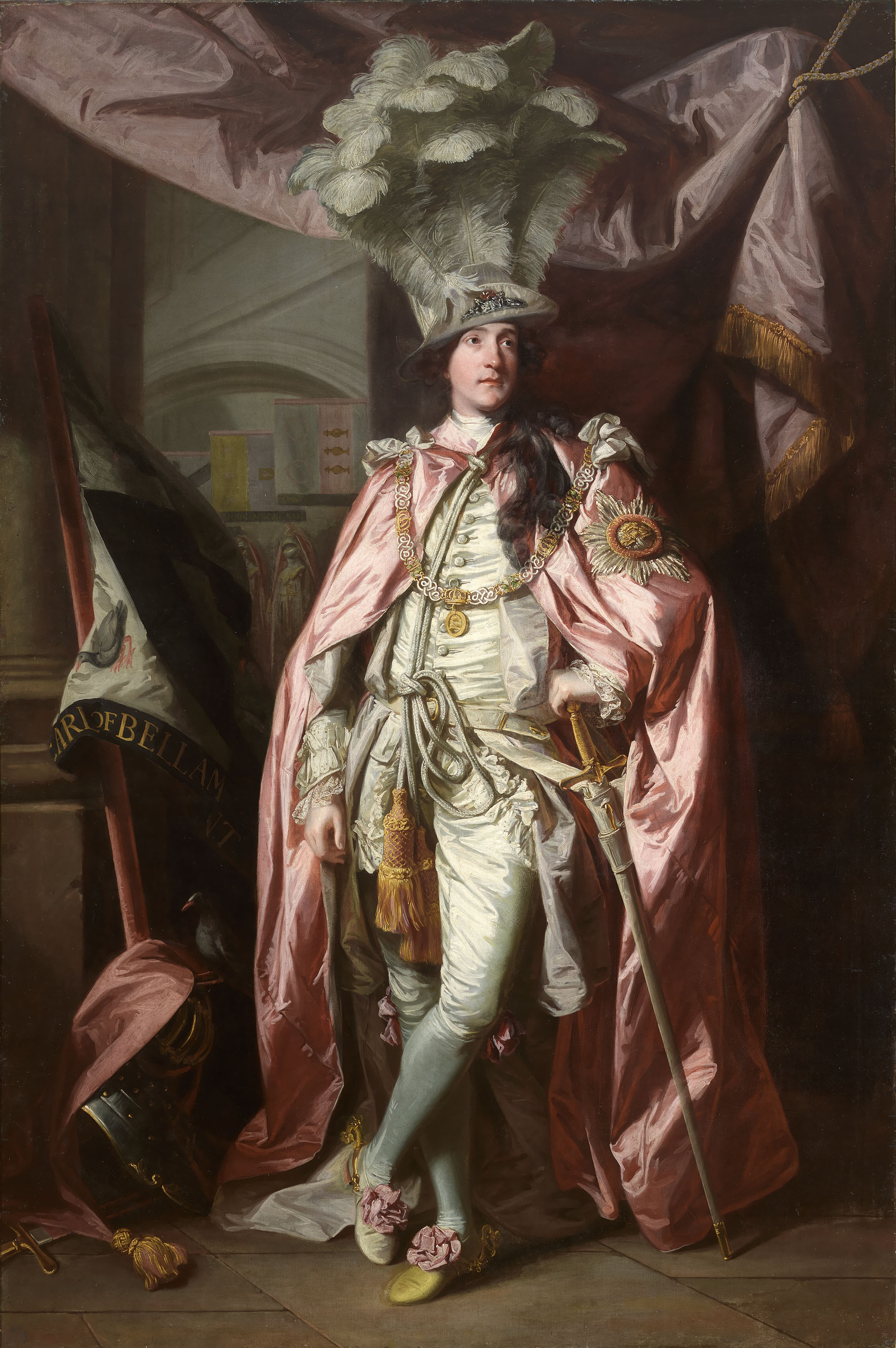
Portrait of The 1st Earl of Bellomont (3rd creation), by Sir Joshua Reynolds. Lord Bellomont is depicted here wearing the mantle of a knight of the Order of the Bath. Note that the title is spelled as 'Bellamont' (with an a) on the flag on the left.

Earl of Bellomont, in the Kingdom of Ireland, was a title that was created three times in the Peerage of Ireland. The first creation came on 9 December 1680 when Charles Kirkhoven, 1st Baron Wotton, was made Earl of Bellomont. He had already been created Baron Wotton, of Wotton in the County of Kent, in the Peerage of England on 31 August 1650. He was childless and both titles became extinct on his death in 1683.

The second creation came on 2 November 1689 when Richard Coote, 2nd Baron Coote, later Governor of New York, was made Earl of Bellomont. He was the son of Richard Coote, who had been created Lord Coote, Baron of Coloony, in the County of Sligo, in the Peerage of Ireland on 6 September 1660. Lord Coote was a younger son of Sir Charles Coote, 1st Baronet, and the younger brother of Charles Coote, 1st Earl of Mountrath (see Coote baronets for more information on this branch of the family). Lord Bellomont was succeeded by his elder son, Nanfan, the second Earl, who in his turn was succeeded by his younger brother, Richard, the third Earl. The earldom became extinct when the latter died without surviving male issue in 1766.

The late Earl was succeeded in the barony of Coote by his first cousin once removed, Charles Coote, who became the fifth Baron. Charles was the son of Charles Coote (1695–1750), Member of Parliament for County Cavan, son of Thomas Coote, a Justice of the Court of King's Bench (Ireland), younger son of the first Baron. On 4 September 1767 the earldom of Bellomont was created for the third time when Charles was made Earl of Bellomont (although the title was probably erroneously spelt "Bellamont" in the letters patent). On 18 May 1774 Lord Bellomont was created a Baronet, of Donnybrooke in the County of Dublin, in the Baronetage of Ireland, with remainder to his illegitimate son Charles Coote. On his death in 1800 the barony and earldom became extinct as he left no surviving legitimate male issue. He was succeeded in the baronetcy according to the special remainder by his illegitimate son, Charles, the second Baronet (see Coote baronets for further history of this title).

== Properties ==
The family seat was located at Bellamont House in County Cavan and at 15 Temple Street in Dublin. The Dublin townhouse was later to become Temple Street Children's Hospital from 1879.

== Earls of Bellomont; First creation (1680) ==
- Charles Kirkhoven, 1st Earl of Bellomont (died 1683)

== Barons Coote (1660) ==
- Richard Coote, 1st Baron Coote (1620–1683)
- Richard Coote, 2nd Baron Coote (1636–1701) (created Earl of Bellomont in 1689)

== Earls of Bellomont; Second creation (1689) ==
- Richard Coote, 1st Earl of Bellomont (1636–1701)
- Nanfan Coote, 2nd Earl of Bellomont (1681–1708), who married Lucia Anna de Nassau, daughter of Henry de Nassau, Count of Nassau, and Frances van Aersen, on 17 February 1705/6 (died September 1744).
- Richard Coote, 3rd Earl of Bellomont (1682–1766)
  - Richard Coote, Viscount Coote (died 1740)
  - Thomas Coote, Viscount Coote (1710–1765)

== Barons Coote (1660; Reverted) ==
- Charles Coote, 5th Baron Coote (1738–1800) (created Earl of Bellomont in 1767)

== Earls of Bellomont; Third creation (1767) ==
- Charles Coote, 1st Earl of Bellomont (1738–1800), who married Emily FitzGerald, daughter of the first Duke and Duchess of Leinster
  - Charles Coote, Viscount Coote (1778–1786)

== See also ==
- Coote baronets
- Viscount Bellomont
