= Baron Coote =

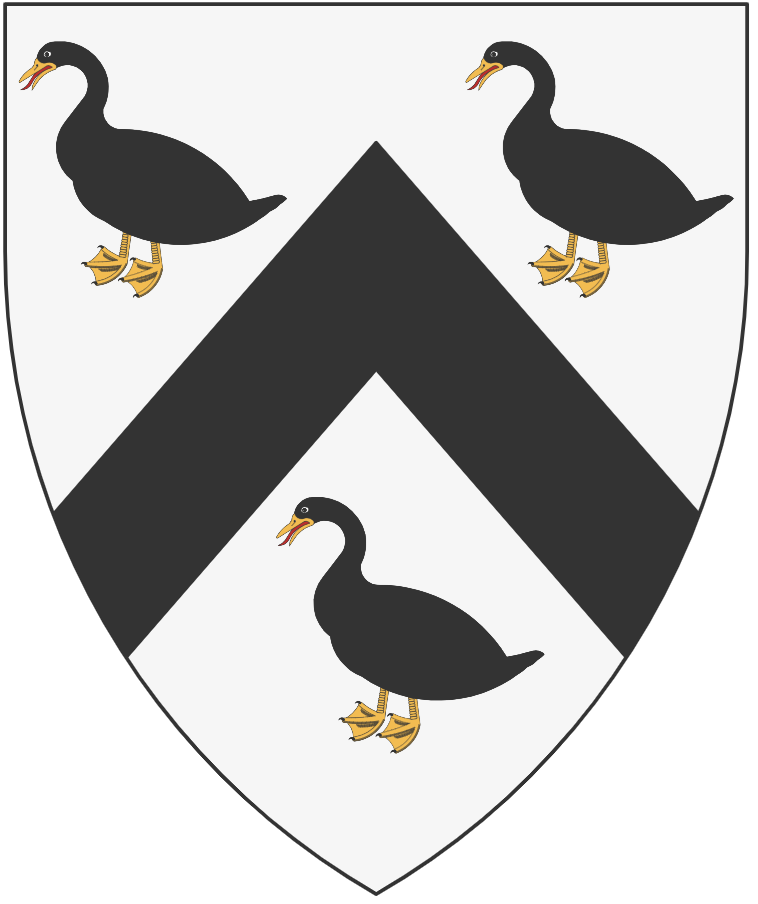
Coat of arms of Coote of Castle Cuffe

Baron Coote is a title that has been created twice in the Peerage of Ireland, both on the same day and both for members of the Coote family:

- The title of Baron Coote, of Castle Cuffe in the Queen's County, was created on 6 September 1660 for Sir Charles Coote, 2nd Baronet, who was made Earl of Mountrath at the same time. For further history of this creation, see Coote baronets.
- The title of Lord Coote, Baron of Coloony, in the Queen's County, was created on 6 September 1660 for Richard Coote, younger brother of the first Earl of Mountrath. For more information on this creation, see Earl of Bellomont.

== See also ==
- Baron Castle Coote (1725–1827)
