= Charles Leslie =

Charles Leslie may refer to:

- Charles Leslie (nonjuror) (1650–1722), Irish Anglican priest and nonjuror
- Charles Leslie (bishop) (1810–1870), Irish Anglican bishop of Kilmore, Elphin and Ardagh, great-great-grandson of the above
- Charles Leslie (art collector), American art collector and LGBT rights activist
- Charles Leslie (cricketer) (1861–1921), English cricketer
- Charles Leslie (writer) (fl. 1710), Barbadian writer
- Charles Leslie (painter) (1839–1886), English painter
- Charles Robert Leslie (1794–1859), English painter
- Charles Powell Leslie (1731–1800), member of the Irish Parliament for Hillsborough and later Monaghan County
- Charles Powell Leslie (1769–1831), Irish member of the UK Parliament for Monaghan and later New Ross
- Charles Powell Leslie (1821–1871), Irish member and later lord lieutenant of Monaghan
- Charles Miller Leslie (1923–2009), American medical anthropologist
- Charles C. Leslie (1841–?), African American fisherman, mariner, and businessman
