= Earl of Dartrey =

UK title of nobility

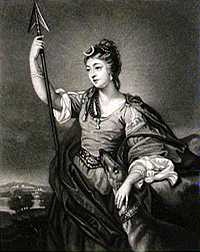
Anne, first wife of Thomas, 1st Viscount Cremorne

Earl of Dartrey, of Dartrey in the County of Monaghan, was a title in the Peerage of the United Kingdom. It was created in July 1866 for the 3rd Baron Cremorne.

Thomas Dawson, Burgess of Armagh, came from Yorkshire to Ireland during the reign of Elizabeth I. During the 1650s and 1660s, his second son, Richard, a cornet in Cromwell's cavalry, purchased 31 townlands which formed the nucleus of the family's estates in County Monaghan. His only daughter and heiress, Frances, married her cousin Walter Dawson (died 1718) of Armagh, who built Dawson's Grove, County Monaghan. Their son, Richard Dawson (died 1766), represented County Monaghan in the Irish House of Commons, becoming a Dublin banker and Alderman. He married Elizabeth Vesey, daughter of The Most Rev. Dr John Vesey, Church of Ireland Archbishop of Tuam and Lord Justice of Ireland.

Richard's and Elizabeth's third son, Thomas Dawson, also sat as Member of Parliament for County Monaghan from 1749 to 1768 in the Parliament of Ireland. In 1770, he was raised to the Peerage of Ireland as Baron Dartrey, of Dawson's Grove in the County of Monaghan, and in 1785 he was made Viscount Cremorne, also in the Peerage of Ireland. Both titles were created with normal remainder to the heirs male of his body. In 1797 (after his three sons had all predeceased him) he was created Baron Cremorne, of Castle Dawson in the County of Monaghan (some sources claim "of Dawson-Grove in the County of Monaghan"), in the Peerage of Ireland, with remainder to his nephew Richard Dawson, Member of the British Parliament for County Monaghan from 1801 to 1807. On Lord Cremorne's death in 1813, the barony of Dartrey and the viscountcy became extinct.

However, Viscount Cremorne was succeeded in the Barony of Cremorne, according to the special remainder, by his great-nephew Richard Thomas Dawson, the second Baron. He was the son of the above Richard Dawson. Lord Cremorne represented County Monaghan in the British House of Commons between 1812 and 1813. He was succeeded by his eldest son, the third Baron. In 1847 he was created Baron Dartrey, of Dartrey in the County of Monaghan, in the Peerage of the United Kingdom, which entitled him to an automatic seat in the House of Lords. He served as a government whip in the Liberal administrations of Lord Palmerston and Lord Russell. In 1866, he was further honoured when he was made Earl of Dartrey, of Dartrey in the County of Monaghan, also in the Peerage of the United Kingdom. He was succeeded by his eldest son, the second Earl. He sat as Member of Parliament for County Monaghan from 1865 to 1868. He died without surviving male issue and was succeeded by his youngest brother, the third Earl. He married Mary, 24th Baroness de Ros. Their eldest daughter Una succeeded her mother in the barony of de Ros (see the Baron de Ros for further history of this title). Lord Dartrey had two other daughters but no sons and on his death in 1933 all his titles became extinct.

Several other members of the Dawson family also gained distinction. Lucius Henry Dawson (died 1795), nephew of the first Viscount and uncle of the second Baron, was a captain in the Royal Navy. Thomas Vesey Dawson, also a nephew of the first Viscount and uncle of the second Baron, was Dean of Clonmacnoise. Thomas Vesey Dawson (1819–1854), second son of the second Baron, was a lieutenant-colonel in the Coldstream Guards and fought in the Crimean War, where he was killed in action at the Battle of Inkerman in 1854. His eldest son Vesey John Dawson was a major-general in the army, while his second son Douglas Dawson was a brigadier-general in the army as well as comptroller of the Lord Chamberlain's Department. Edward Stanley Dawson (1843–1919), second son of the first Earl, was a captain in the Royal Navy.

== Barons Dartrey (1770); Viscounts Cremorne (1785); Barons Cremorne (1797) ==
- Thomas Dawson, 1st Viscount Cremorne, 1st Baron Cremorne (1725–1813)
  - The Honourable Richard Dawson (died 1778)
  - The Honourable Thomas Dawson (c. 1771 – 1787)

== Barons Cremorne (1797) ==
- Richard Dawson, 2nd Baron Cremorne (1788–1827)
- Richard Dawson, 3rd Baron Cremorne (1817–1897; created Earl of Dartrey in 1866)

== Earls of Dartrey (1866) ==
- Richard Dawson, 1st Earl of Dartrey (1817–1897)
- Vesey Dawson, 2nd Earl of Dartrey (1842–1920)
  - The Honourable Richard George Dawson (1890–1894)
- Anthony Lucius Dawson, 3rd Earl of Dartrey (1855–1933)
  - Una Ross, 25th Baroness de Ros (1879 – 1956)

== See also ==
- Baron de Ros
