= Charles Powell Leslie =

Charles Powell Leslie may refer to:

- Charles Powell Leslie (1731–1800), member of the Irish Parliament for Hillsborough (1771–1776) and Monaghan County (1783–1800)
- Charles Powell Leslie (1769–1831), his son, Irish member of the UK Parliament for Monaghan (1801–1826) and New Ross (1830–1831)
- Charles Powell Leslie (1821–1871), his son, member of the UK Parliament for Monaghan (1843–1871) and Lord Lieutenant of Monaghan (1858–1871)
