= General Dawson =

General Dawson

- Bertrand Dawson, 1st Viscount Dawson of Penn (1864–1945), Royal Army Medical Corps major general
- Brian Dawson (general) (born 1954), Australian Army major general
- Donald Dawson (1908–2005), U.S. Air Force Reserve major general
- Douglas Dawson (1854–1933), British Army brigadier general
- Richard Dawson (British Army officer) (died c. 1800), British Army lieutenant general
- Vesey John Dawson (1853–1930), British Army major general
