= Thomas Vesey Dawson =

Irish Whig politician and army officer

Member of Parliament for County Monaghan
- In office 10 August 1847 – 26 July 1852 Serving with Charles Powell Leslie
- Preceded by: Charles Powell Leslie; Evelyn Shirley
- Succeeded by: Charles Powell Leslie; George Forster

Member of Parliament for County Louth
- In office 15 July 1841 – 10 August 1847 Serving with Richard Bellew
- Preceded by: Thomas Fortescue; Richard Bellew
- Succeeded by: Richard Bellew; Chichester Parkinson-Fortescue

Personal details
- Born: 3 September 1819
- Died: 5 November 1854 (aged 35) Inkerman, Taurida Governorate, Russian Empire
- Cause of death: Killed in action at the Battle of Inkerman
- Party: Whig
- Parent(s): Richard Thomas Dawson, 2nd Baron Cremorne; Anne Elizabeth Emily Whaley

Lt.-Col. Hon. Thomas Vesey Dawson (3 September 1819 – 5 November 1854) was an Irish Whig politician and army officer.

He was the son of Richard Thomas Dawson, 2nd Baron Cremorne and Anne Elizabeth Emily née Whaley. In 1851, he married Hon. Augusta Frederic Annie FitzPatrick, daughter of John FitzPatrick, 1st Baron Castletown and Augusta Mary née Douglas. They had at least two children: Vesey John Dawson and Douglas Dawson.

Dawson was first elected Whig MP for County Louth at the 1841 general election and held the seat until 1847, when he was instead elected MP for County Monaghan. He remained MP for the latter seat until 1852, when he did not seek re-election.

He attained the rank of lieutenant-colonel in the Coldstream Guards, a role that led to his death at the Battle of Inkerman in 1854.

He was a member of the Guards' Club and Reform Club.

Parliament of the United Kingdom
Preceded by Thomas Fortescue; Richard Bellew	Member of Parliament for County Louth; 1841–1847; With: Richard Bellew	Succeeded by Richard Bellew; Chichester Parkinson-Fortescue
Preceded by Charles Powell Leslie; Evelyn Shirley	Member of Parliament for County Monaghan; 1847–1852; With: Charles Powell Leslie	Succeeded by Charles Powell Leslie; George Forster
