= Vesey Dawson, 2nd Earl of Dartrey =

Irish Liberal politician

The Earl of Dartrey

Member of Parliament for County Monaghan
- In office 24 July 1865 – 25 November 1868 Serving with Charles Powell Leslie
- Preceded by: Charles Powell Leslie; Sir George Forster
- Succeeded by: Charles Powell Leslie; Sewallis Shirley

Personal details
- Born: Vesey Dawson; 22 April 1842
- Died: 14 June 1920 (aged 78) Dartrey Castle, County Monaghan
- Party: Liberal
- Spouse: Julia Georgiana Sarah Wombwell (m. 1882)
- Parent(s): Richard Dawson, 1st Earl of Dartrey (father); Augusta Stanley (mother)
- Education: Eton College

Vesey Dawson, 2nd Earl of Dartrey (22 April 1842 – 14 June 1920), styled Viscount Cremorne between 1866 and 1897, was an Irish Liberal politician.

== Family and early life ==
Dawson was the eldest child of Richard Dawson, 1st Earl of Dartrey (then Lord Cremorne), and his wife, Augusta Stanley, daughter of Edward Stanley and Lady Mary Maitland. He became known by the courtesy title Viscount Cremorne in July 1866 upon his father's elevation to an earldom. Educated at Eton College, he later became a captain and, later still, a lieutenant-colonel in the Coldstream Guards, retiring from the British Army in 1876. In 1882, Lord Cremorne married Julia Georgiana Sarah Wombwell, daughter of Sir George Orby Wombwell and Lady Julia Sarah Alice Child-Villiers. Together, they had three children:

- Lady Edith Anne Dawson (1883–1974), married Captain Charles Ashe Wyndham
- Lady Mary Augusta Dawson (1887–1961), married Hon. Sir George Crichton, son of the 4th Earl Erne
- Richard George Dawson (1890–1894)

== Political career ==
He was elected in the 1865 general election as one of the two Members of Parliament (MPs) for County Monaghan, but stood down at the next general election, in 1868.

Lord Cremorne, as he then was, served as High Sheriff of Monaghan in 1878.

Earl and Countess Dartrey attended the 1903 Delhi Durbar to mark the accession of King Edward VII as Emperor of India.

== Peerage ==
Viscount Cremorne succeeded as 2nd Earl of Dartrey upon his father's death in May 1897. Upon his own death in 1920, he was succeeded by his brother, Anthony Lucius Dawson, who became 3rd Earl of Dartrey.

As Lord Dartrey, he owned around 25,000 acres of land and was a member of the Travellers' Club on Kildare Street in Dublin.

== Death ==
Lord Dartrey died at his home, Dartrey Castle in County Monaghan, after a long illness in 1920.

Parliament of the United Kingdom
Preceded by Charles Powell Leslie; George Forster	Member of Parliament for County Monaghan; 1865 – 1868; With: Charles Powell Leslie	Succeeded by Charles Powell Leslie; Sewallis Shirley
Peerage of the United Kingdom
Preceded by Richard Dawson	Earl of Dartrey; 1897–1920	Succeeded by Anthony Lucius Dawson
