= 1871 County Monaghan by-election =

UK Parliamentary by-election

The 1871 County Monaghan by-election was fought on 22 July 1871. The by-election was fought due to the Death of the incumbent MP of the Conservative Party, Charles Powell Leslie III. It was won by the Conservative candidate John Leslie.
