= Evelyn Shirley =

Evelyn Shirley may refer to:

- Evelyn Shirley (1788–1856), Member of Parliament (MP)
- Evelyn Shirley (1812–1882), MP, son of the above
