= Sewallis Shirley (MP) =

British politician

Sewallis Shirley DL, JP
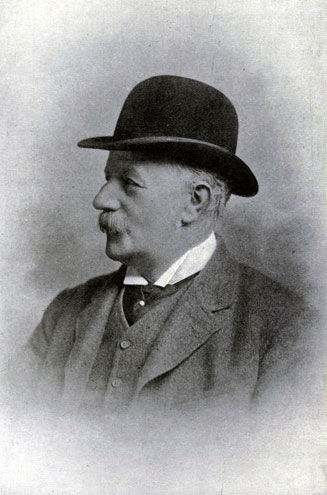

Member of Parliament for County Monaghan
- In office 1868–1880
- Preceded by: Viscount Cremorne
- Succeeded by: John Givan

Personal details
- Born: Sewallis Evelyn Shirley; 15 July 1844 Ettington Park Hotel, Warwickshire, UK
- Died: 7 March 1904 (aged 59) London, UK
- Party: Conservative
- Spouse: Emily Jean Macdonald

Sewallis Evelyn Shirley DL, JP (15 July 1844 – 7 March 1904), was a British politician. He is best known as the founder of the Kennel Club in Britain in 1873.

== Background and education ==
A member of the Shirley family headed by the Earl Ferrers, Shirley was the son of Evelyn Shirley and Mary Clara Elizabeth, daughter of Sir Edmund Lechmere, 2nd Baronet. His paternal grandfather was Evelyn Philip Shirley. Shirley was born at the family's English estate of Ettington Park near Stratford-upon-Avon. He was educated at Eton College. He matriculated at Christ Church, Oxford in 1864, but did not take a degree.

Shirley was presented to the Prince of Wales at a special levée at St James's Palace on 1 June 1869. He was accompanied by his father, and was one of 350 at the event.

== Political career ==
Shirley's family had a long connection with County Monaghan in Ireland, and they owned a large estate at Lough Fea, Carrickmacross. Shirley entered Parliament for County Monaghan (a seat previously held by both his father and grandfather) on 17 November 1868, and won election through a promise to defend the Protestant constitution. He continued to represent the constituency until 31 March 1880, but rarely spoke in Parliament, and is thought to have lost his seat when opposition Liberal supporters ran a successful campaign based on tenants' rights. He attempted to return to politics in 1885, standing against an Irish nationalist candidate for the newly created seat of South Monaghan, but was heavily defeated.

Shirley was also a Deputy Lieutenant and Justice of the Peace for County Monaghan and served as High Sheriff of Monaghan in 1884. Although he was heavily involved in local affairs as initially guided by his father, and involved in improvements to the estate such as the construction of a new church in 1865, relations with the tenant farmers on his estates, which he inherited in 1882, remained poor. This, combined with forced evictions following the agricultural depression of the 1880s, led to his estate being targeted by the Irish nationalist Plan of Campaign. It also resulted in issues with the local railway, with a boycott by farmers of the station at Carrickmacross taking place in 1890.

== Dog breeding ==
Throughout his life Shirley had a keen interest in dogs, both working dogs and pure breeds. His Fox Terrier won a silver cup at the Birmingham Dog Show in 1867, and three years later he repeated the victory with an English Bull Terrier. During his show career he also owned a variety of other breeds including Bulldogs, Collies and a number of Retrievers. In 1873 he brought together a group of similar minded people with the aim of creating an establishment of a governing body which would allow the definition of dog breeds to protect pedigrees and to improve the standards of hygiene at dog shows. Later that year, the Kennel Club was formed, with Shirley sitting as secretary from 1873 to 1899. He also acted as a dog judge, including at both shows across all types and in field trials for breeds such as Setters and Pointers. The last show he attended was the twentieth annual Hunter's Improvement Society, held at the Royal Agricultural Hall in Islington less than a week prior to his death. He was also known for owning several racehorses.

== Family ==
Prior to his marriage, he continued to reside at Ettington Park with his father and siblings. Shirley married Emily Jean, daughter of Colonel William Macdonald, in 1884. By the time of the 1891 census, he was the head of the household of Ettington Hall, along with his wife, their son Evelyn, and his widowed mother, Mary. Emily Jean died in July 1918.

== Death ==
Shirley died in London on 7 March 1904 while there on a short visit. He was staying at the Hotel Windsor on Victoria Street and returned there by taxi after visiting his friends. Some early newspaper reports stated that he had been assaulted, with his watch and other valuables taken, but his obituaries omit those details. He was rushed to Westminster Hospital but died soon after he was admitted. The coroner later determined that the cause of death was a brain haemorrhage, and described the more elaborate reports as "the result of a lurid imagination".

== See also ==
- Earl Ferrers

Parliament of the United Kingdom
Preceded by Charles Powell Leslie III; Viscount Cremorne	Member of Parliament for County Monaghan; 1868–1880; With: Charles Powell Leslie III 1868–1871; John Leslie 1871–1880	Succeeded by John Givan; William Findlater
