= Custos Rotulorum of County Monaghan =

The Custos Rotulorum of County Monaghan was the highest civil officer in County Monaghan. The position was later combined with that of Lord Lieutenant of Monaghan.

== Incumbents ==
- 1656–?1670 Richard Blayney, 4th Baron Blayney
- 1761–1775 Cadwallader Blayney, 9th Baron Blayney
- 1775–1805 William Henry Fortescue, 1st Earl of Clermont
- 1805–1842 Warner Westenra, 2nd Baron Rossmore

For later custodes rotulorum, see Lord Lieutenant of Monaghan
