= Warner Westenra =

Warner Westenra may refer to:

- Warner Westenra (Irish MP) (died 1772), MP for Maryborough
- Warner Westenra, 2nd Baron Rossmore (1765–1842), Irish landowner and politician, grandson of the above
