= Alexander Montgomery (British Army officer, died 1785) =

Irish MP for County Monaghan (c. 1721 – 1785)

General Alexander Montgomery (c. 1721–1785) was an Irish MP for County Monaghan, Ireland.

His father was John Montgomery of Ballyleck, County Monaghan (M.P. for County Monaghan and second son of Colonel Alexander Montgomery (1667–1722)). John had succeeded his father to the Ballyleck Estate when his elder brother Thomas was disinherited for marrying an Englishwoman.

His mother was Mary Coxe, a Maid of Honour to Queen Caroline, wife of King George II of Great Britain. Mary Coxe's father was also the Queen's physician and governor of New Jersey, Dr Daniel Coxe. Montgomery's first cousin was the American Revolution war-hero Major-General Richard Montgomery, a son of the disgraced Thomas.

He was a General of Volunteers. He succeeded his elder brother John Montgomery (died 1741) as an M.P. for County Monaghan in the Parliament of Ireland from 1743 to 1760 and from August 1768 – 1783. He was appointed High Sheriff of Monaghan for 1747–48.

== Marriages ==
1. Miss Catharine Willoughby, daughter of Colonel Hugh Willoughby of Carrow, County Fermanagh in 1746, by whom he had Colonel John Montgomery (1747–1797) (Member of Parliament for County Monaghan. Colonel in the Monaghan Militia. d.s.p.), Colonel Hugh Montgomery (1749-1794 Colonel in the Honourable East India Company's service. Died unmarried in Madras, India), Reverend Robert Montgomery (1753-1825 Rector of Monaghan, Ireland)

2. Miss Eleanora Moore, daughter of Acheson Moore of Garvey, Tyrone, Ireland by whom he had Colonel Nathaniel Montgomery of Garvey, Revella and Fassaroe Castle, Co. Wicklow (Member of Parliament for County Tyrone. Colonel of the Tyrone Militia. He assumed in right of his mother the additional surname and arms of Moore.), Miss Sidney Montgomery & Miss Maria Montgomery (neither of whom married).

Montgomery's nickname was "Young Sandy" to distinguish him from his cousin "Old Sandy" Alexander Montgomery (1720–1800) who served in the Irish Parliament at the same time as the M.P. for County Donegal. "The Irish Parliament 1775" states- "Always against the Government. Lord Dartrey & Lord Blayney have some Influence with him.". Sketches of the Members of the Irish Parliament in 1782 stated- "Alexander Montgomery Esq., member for Monaghan County-Has a large estate-a very respectable man-opposed till the Duke of Portland's arrival".
