= John Montgomery (died 1733) =

John Montgomery (died 1733) was an Irish MP for County Monaghan, Ireland.

He was the second son of Colonel Alexander Montgomery MP for County Monaghan, of Ballyleck, County Monaghan and Elizabeth Cole, daughter of Colonel Thomas Cole of Mount Florence, County Fermanagh. He succeeded his father to the Ballyleck Estate when his elder brother Thomas Montgomery (Irish politician) was disinherited for marrying an Englishwoman.

He commanded a regiment of horse under the Duke of Marlborough. He was elected as MP for County Monaghan, Ireland and served from November 1727 to August 1733. He was appointed High Sheriff of Monaghan for 1726.

He married Mary Coxe, a Maid of Honour to Queen Caroline, wife of King George II of Great Britain. Mary Coxe's father was also the Queen's physician and governor of New Jersey, Dr Daniel Coxe.

Montgomery's sons were:

- John Montgomery (died 1741)
- General Alexander Montgomery (died 1785), (both later served as MPs for County Monaghan)

His nephew was the American Revolution war-hero, Major-General Richard Montgomery.

After Col. John Montgomery's death, his wife married William Clement, Vice Provost of Trinity College Dublin and MP for Dublin University and later for Dublin City. She died at Beaulieu, County Louth in 1790, aged 97 years.
