= High Sheriff of Monaghan =

The High Sheriff of Monaghan was the British monarch's representative in County Monaghan, a territory known as his bailiwick. Selected from three nominated people, he held his office for the duration of a year. He had judicial, ceremonial and administrative functions and executed High Court Writs.

== History ==
The office of High Sheriff was the oldest under the crown. In England it had its establishment before the Norman Conquest. The High Sheriff remained first in precedence in the counties, until the reign of Edward VII, when an Order in Council in 1908 gave the Lord-Lieutenant the prime office under the Crown as the Sovereign's personal representative. In Ireland, the office of High Sheriff was formally abolished by the Court Officers Act 1926.

The High Sheriff of Monaghan was the British Crown's judicial representative in County Monaghan from its creation in 1585 until 1922, when the office was abolished.

== High Sheriffs of Monaghan ==
=== 17th century ===
- 1590: Ross bane McMahon
- 1605: Richard (Rhisiart) Blayney
- 1609–1612: Richard (Rhisiart) Blayney
- 1660: Captain Foster
- 1662: Oliver Ancketill
- 1664: Simon Richardson
- 1677: James Corry
- 1682: Matthew Ancketill of Ancketills Grove
- 1689: Major John McKenna of Monmurry
- 1692: Henry Richardson of Poplar Vale
- 1693: Blayney Owen of Newgrove
- 1698: Henry Evatt of Monaghan Co. Ireland

=== 18th century ===
- 1700: Henry Richardson of Poplar Vale
- 1703: Oliver Ancketill of Ancketills Grove
- 1703: Francis Lucas of Castle Shane
- 1704: George Scott of Roagh
- 1707: William Ancketill of Ancketills Grove
- 1709: Edward Lucas of Castle Shane
- 1710: William Ley
- 1711: Alexander Montgomery
- 1712:
- 1715: John Forster
- 1718: Colonel Alexander Montgomery of Ballyleck
- 1719:
- 1726: John Montgomery of Ballyleck
- 1728: Baptist Johnson
- 1729:
- 1731: Henry Owen
- 1732: Blayney Owen of Newgrove
- 1733:
- 1738: Richard Johnston
- 1739: Nicholas Forster, styled 1st Baronet
- 1740: Humphrey Evatt of Mount Louise
- 1743: Galbraith Lowry-Corry
- 1744:
- 1747: Alexander Montgomery of Ballyleck
- 1748: Francis Lucas of Grenon
- 1750: John Madden of Hilton Park
- 1751:
- 1752: Edward Lucas of Castle Shane
- 1757: John Slacke of Slackesgrove
- 1758:
- 1762: Matthew Ancketill of Arlington Castle
- 1763: William Ley of Leysborough
- 1763: Edward Lucas of Moynalty
- 1764:
- 1770: Thomas Lucas of Derryhalla
- 1772: William Barton Tenison of Monalty
- 1773: Francis Lucas of Castle Shane
- 1777: John Montgomery of Ballyleck
- 1778:
- 1782: Thomas Corry of Fairfield
- 1783: Matthew Anketill of Arlington Castle, Portarlington
- 1784: Nathaniel Montgomery of Rosefield
- 1785: Richard Adams of Shercock House, Cavan
- 1786: (Sir) James Hamilton
- 1788: Charles Powell Leslie II of Glaslough
- 1792: Richard Dawson of Dawson Grove
- 1793: Edward Richardson of Poplar Vale
- 1794:

=== 19th century ===
- 1800:
- 1804: Richard Ley
- 1805: Charles Albert Leslie
- 1806: Robert Lucas
- 1807: Thomas Charles Stewart Corry of Rockcorry Castle and William Henry
- 1808: William Henry
- 1809: Richard Henry Mitchell
- 1810: Thomas Coote
- 1811: John Madden
- 1812: Charles Evatt
- 1813: Charles Madden
- 1814: Thomas Cottnam
- 1815: Robert Waring Maxwell
- 1816: Thomas Seaver of Heath Hall
- 1817: George Forster, later Sir George Forster, 2nd Baronet of Coolderry
- 1818: Rt Hon Edward Lucas of Castle Shane
- 1819: John Maine
- 1820: William Verner of Churchill
- 1821: Hon Richard Westenra
- 1822: Henry Rowley
- 1823: William Forster
- 1824: Evelyn Shirley, of Carrickimacross
- 1825: James Wood-Wright of Gola
- 1827: William Tennison of Ballyframer, Carrickmacross
- 1830: William Ancketill of Ancketills Grove
- 1834: Matthew John Ancketell of Ancketell Grove
- 1835: Owen Blayney Cole
- 1836: Charles Dawson of Tanagh, Coote Hill
- 1837: Evelyn Philip Shirley of Carrickmacross
- 1839: Thomas Singleton of Fort Singleton
- 1841: Thomas Rothwell of Clantoknee
- 1841: Thomas Fitzherbert of Black Castle and Shantohagh
- 1842: John Lloyd Kernan of Cabragh Lodge
- 1843: John Hatchell of Bessmount
- 1843: Owen Blaney Cole
- 1844: Sir John Francis O'Neill Lentaigne of Tallaght House
- 1845: Andre Allen Murray-Ker of Lough Owna
- 1846: John Richardson of Poplar Vale
- 1847: Lieut.-Col. Arthur Gambell Lewis of Scotstown
- 1848: Edward William Lucas of Castle Shane
- 1849: Col. Henry Edward Porter of Carrickmacross
- 1850: William Verner of Churchill, Loughgall
- 1851: Charles Boyle of Tannagh House.
- 1852: Capel St. George of Dromore.
- 1853: Charles Hopes of South Hill.
- 1854: Robert Charles (French) Leslie of Ballibay House.
- 1855: Henry Thomas Hope of Castleblayney.
- 1856: James Henry Boyd of Castleblayney.
- 1857: Plunkett Kenny of Moyles.
- 1858: John Leslie of Lara, Carrickmacross.
- 1859: Henry George Johnston of Fort Johnston.
- 1860: Lieut.-Col. Thomas Oriel Forster, 3rd Baronet of Coolderry.
- 1861: Henry Mitchell of Drumreask
- 1862: Capt. Jesse Lloyd of Ballyleck House, Camla.
- 1863: John Madden of Hilton Park.
- 1864: Dacre Mervyn Archdall Hamilton of Cornecassa.
- 1865: William Francis de Vismes Kane of Drumreask.
- 1866: T. Lucas of Woodview.
- 1867: Robert Francis Ellis of Lea Park.
- 1868: Henry Mitchell of Drumreask.
- 1868: Sir Thomas Barrett-Lennard, 2nd Baronet
- 1869: Capt Thomas Coote of Raconnell House.
- 1870: Charles Langdale of The Abbey, Celbridge.
- 1871: Edward Richardson of Poplar Vale.
- 1872: Horatio Shirley of Shirley House, Carrickmacross.
- 1873: John Brady of Clones.
- 1874: Sir William James Tyrone Power of Annaghmakerrig, Newbliss.
- 1875: John Madden of Roslea Manor, Clones.
- 1876: William Henderson of Bessmount Park.
- 1877: William Henry Edward Woodwright of Gola.
- 1878: Richard Dawson, 3rd Baron Cremorne.
- 1879: Edward Scudamore Lucas-Scudamore of Castleshane.
- 1880: Richard Ruxton Fitzherbert of Shantonagh, Castleblayney.
- 1884: Sewallis Shirley of Lough Fea, Carrickmacross.
- 1885: Henry Owen Lewis of Inniskeen.
- 1889: Capt Hon Edward Stanley Dawson.
- 1891: Henry Francis Hope Pelham-Clinton (later Pelham-Clinton-Hope), 8th Duke of Newcastle-under-Lyne.
- 1894: John Marshall Bolton of Castle Ring.
- 1896: Harry Verner of Churchill.
- 1896: Col. William Tenison of Lough Bawn.
- 1897: George Forster Evatt of Mount Louise.
- 1898: Very Rev. Arthur Newburgh Haire-Forster of Ballynure.
- 1899: Capt Hon Edward Stanley Dawson.

=== 20th century ===
- 1900: John Pentland Mahaffy of Earl's Cliff.
- 1902: Edward John Richardson of Poplar Vale.
- 1903: Anketell Moutray of Favour Royal, County Tyrone.
- 1905: Sir John Leslie, 2nd Baronet
- 1906: Lt Col John Clements Waterhouse Madden of Hilton.
- 1907: William Vesey Brownlow
- 1908: Edward Henry John Leslie of Ballibay.
- 1909: William Harvey Swann of Cappog Lodge.
- 1909: William Francis de Vismes Kane of Drumreask.
- 1910: Fitzjohn Murray Irwin of Beech Hill.
- 1911: Sir Robert Anderson, 1st Baronet of Mullaghmor House.
- 1914: Capt. Evelyn Charles Shirley of Shirley House, Carrickmacross.
- 1917: Lord Francis Hope (who later became, in 1928, the 8th Duke of Newcastle-under-Lyne).
