= Thomas Dawson, 1st Viscount Cremorne =

Irish landowner and politician

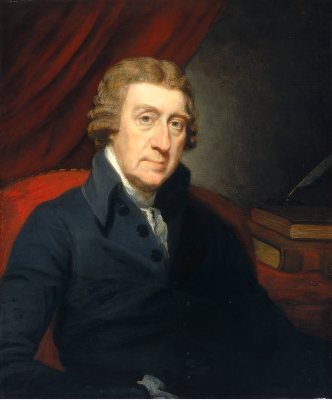
- Born: 25 February 1725
- Died: 1813 (aged 87–88)
- Spouse(s): Philadelphia Hannah Freame, Lady Anne Fermor
- Parent(s): Richard Dawson; Elizabeth Vesey
- Titles: Viscount Cremorne (1, 1785–), Baron Cremorne (1, 1797–), Baron Dartrey (1, 1770–)

Thomas Dawson, 1st Viscount Cremorne was an Irish landowner and politician from County Monaghan.

== Biography ==
He was born on 25 February 1725, the first surviving son of Richard Dawson of Dawson Grove, by his wife Elizabeth Vesey, daughter of John Vesey, Archbishop of Tuam. He represented County Monaghan in the Irish House of Commons from 1749 to 1768, and on 28 May 1770 was raised to the Irish House of Lords as Baron Dartrey, of Dawson's Grove in the County of Monaghan, being elevated to Viscount Cremorne on 19 June 1785.

Lord Cremorne was married on 15 August 1754, at St Martin-in-the-Fields, to Anne Fermor (baptised 25 May 1733), youngest daughter of Thomas Fermor, 1st Earl of Pomfret and his wife, Henrietta Jeffreys, a daughter of The 2nd Baron Jeffreys. Lady Dawson died at Castle Dawson on 1 March 1769 and was buried at Ematris, County Monaghan. Their only son, Richard, died at Cambridge on 3 March 1778.

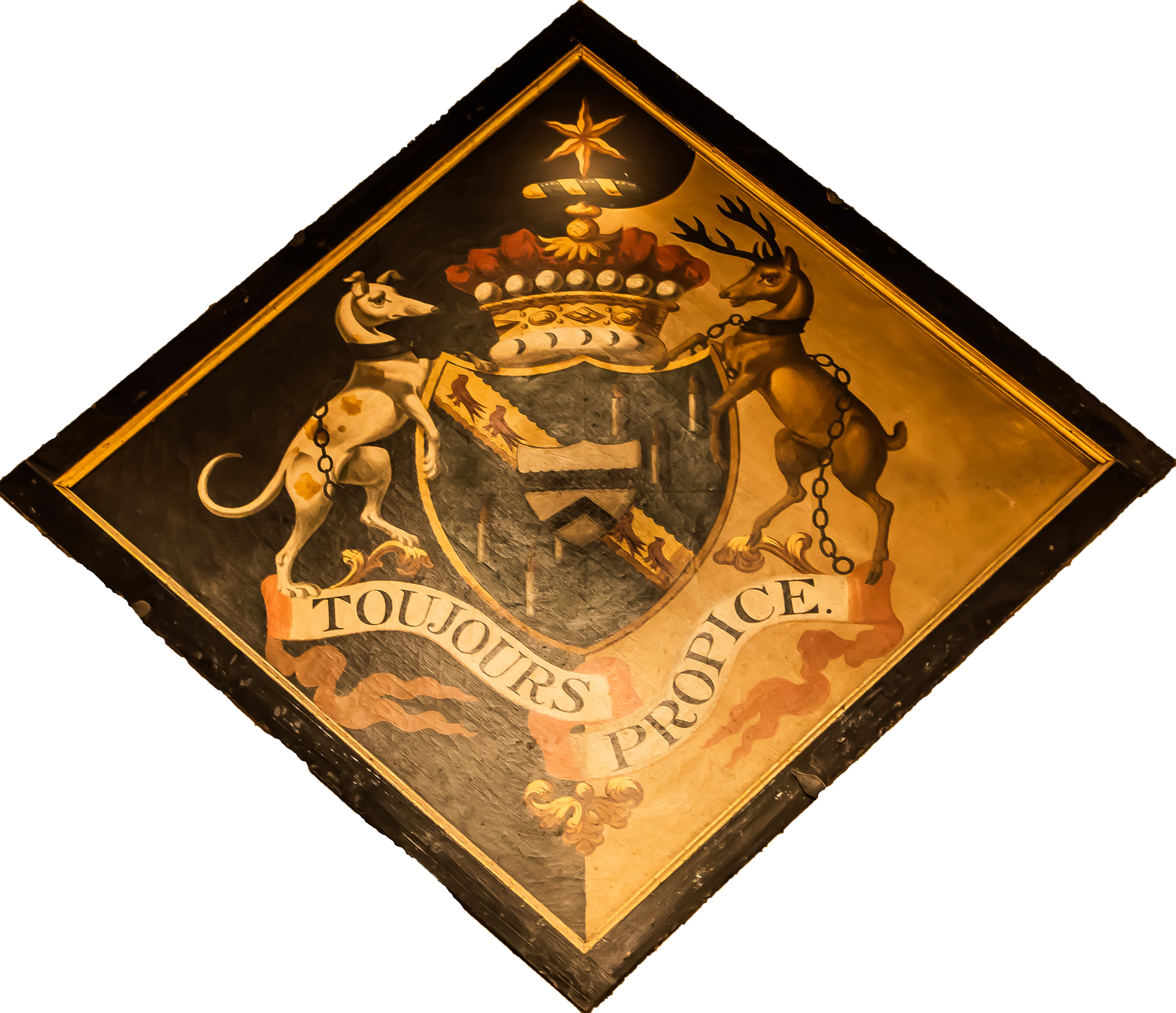
Funeral hatchment in Church of St Giles, Stoke Poges

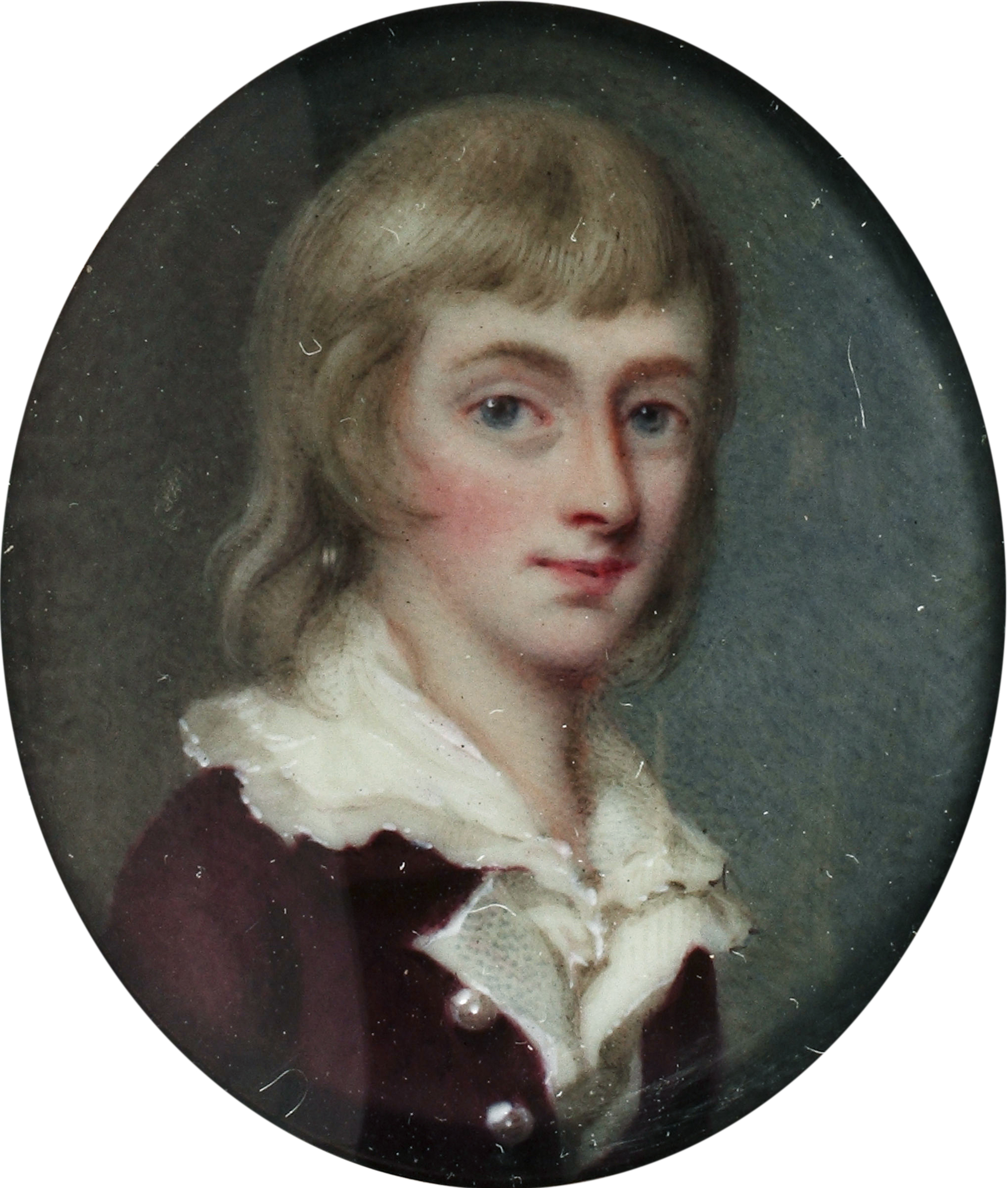
Thomas Dawson (c.1771-1787)

Cremorne married secondly, on 8 May 1770, Philadelphia Hannah, daughter of Thomas Freame of Philadelphia by his wife Margaretta, daughter of William Penn. Their only surviving child, Thomas, died aged sixteen on 9 October 1787, and on 20 November 1797 Cremorne was created Baron Cremorne, of Castle Dawson in the County of Monaghan, with a special remainder, failing the heirs male of his body, to his nephew Richard Dawson and the heirs male of his body.

Lord Cremorne was one of the largest landowners in Ireland, with an annual income from his estates of £8,000 in 1799. He died at Stanhope Street, Mayfair on 1 March 1813. The Viscountcy of Cremorne and the Barony of Dartrey became extinct, while the Barony of Cremorne was inherited by his great-nephew Richard Thomas Dawson. Lady Cremorne died aged eighty-five on 14 April 1826, also at Stanhope Street.

Peerage of Ireland
New creation	Viscount Cremorne; 1785–1813	Extinct
New creation	Baron Dartrey; 1770–1813	Extinct
New creation	Baron Cremorne; 1797–1813	Succeeded by Richard Dawson
