= Cadwallader Blayney, 12th Baron Blayney =

Irish nobleman and politician

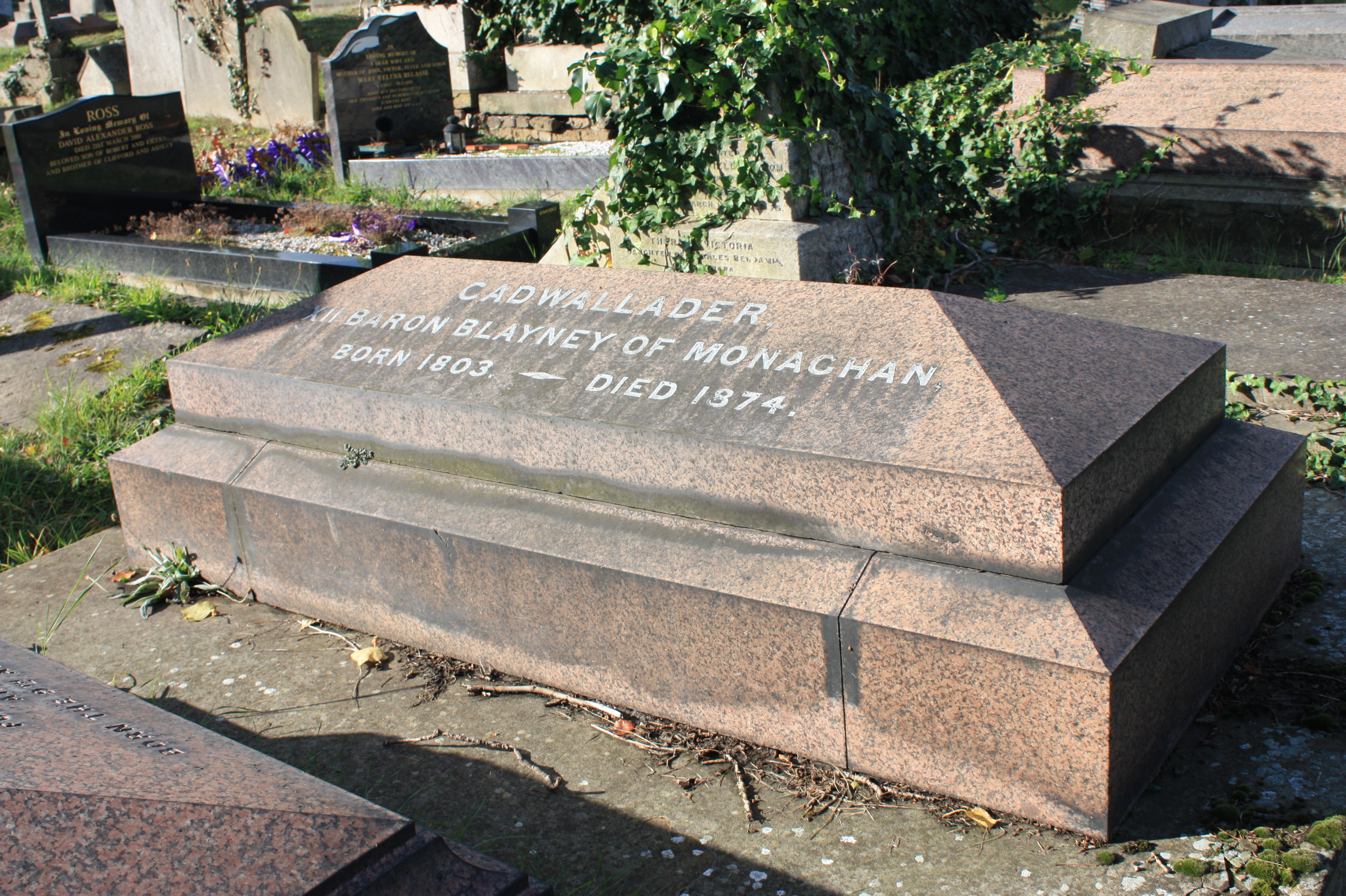
The Cadwallader grave, Kensal Green Cemetery

Cadwallader Davis Blayney, 12th Baron Blayney (19 December 1802 – 18 January 1874), styled The Honourable from birth until 1834, was an Irish nobleman and politician.

Born in Dover Street in London, he was the son of Andrew Blayney, 11th Baron Blayney and his wife Marbella, the eldest daughter of James Alexander, 1st Earl of Caledon.

Blayney was commissioned into the Army as an ensign in the 4th Regiment of Foot on 7 June 1821. He exchanged into the Rifle Brigade as a second lieutenant on 5 July. He purchased a lieutenancy in the 89th Regiment of Foot on 27 January 1825. On 9 April 1825, he exchanged back into the Rifle Brigade, and then to the 7th Regiment of Foot on 9 November. He was promoted to captain in 1826 and went on half-pay. On 7 June 1827, he came off half-pay by exchanging into the 80th Regiment of Foot, and retired from the Army in 1830.

Blayney entered the British House of Commons in 1830 as Tory Member of Parliament (MP) for County Monaghan and held the seat until he succeeded his father as baron in 1834. Seven years later, he was elected an Irish representative peer and joined the House of Lords. He sold the family estate, Castleblayney, Ireland, to Henry Thomas Hope of Deepdene, Surrey in 1852. Blayney died in London without issue aged 71, at the St. James Hotel, Piccadilly, London, after living in the Carlton Club there. The title became extinct on his death.

He is buried in Kensal Green Cemetery north-west of the main chapel.

== See also ==
- Baron Blayney

Parliament of the United Kingdom
Preceded by Henry Westenra; Evelyn Shirley	Member of Parliament for County Monaghan; 1830–1834; With: Evelyn Shirley 1830–1831; Henry Westenra 1831–1832; Louis Perrin 1832–1834	Succeeded by Henry Westenra; Louis Perrin
Political offices
Preceded by The Earl O'Neill	Representative peer for Ireland; 1841–1874	Succeeded by The Lord Castlemaine
Peerage of Ireland
Preceded by Andrew Blayney	Baron Blayney; 1834–1874	Extinct
