= Kathleen Pelham-Clinton, Duchess of Newcastle =

British duchess and dog breeder (1871–1955)

Her Grace The Duchess of Newcastle OBE
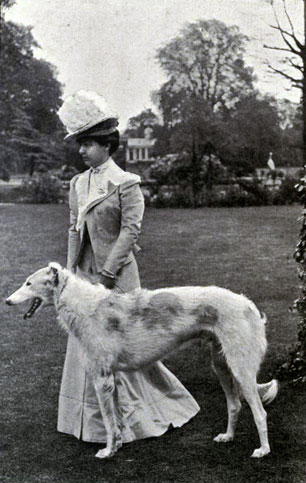
- The Duchess with one of her Borzois
- Born: Kathleen Florence May Candy; 6 May 1871; United Kingdom
- Died: 1 June 1955 (aged 84)
- Spouse: Henry Pelham-Clinton, 7th Duke of Newcastle (m. 1889; died 1928)
- Parents: Maj Henry Augustus Candy; Hon. Frances Westenra

Kathleen Florence May Pelham-Clinton, Duchess of Newcastle-under-Lyme OBE (née Candy; 6 May 1871–1 June 1955), was a well-known conformation show judge and dog breeder who influenced the Borzoi and Wire Fox Terrier breeds.

== Early life ==
Born in 1871, the future Duchess was the daughter of Major Henry Augustus Candy by his marriage to Hon. Frances Kathleen Westenra, the daughter of Henry Robert Westenra, 3rd Baron Rossmore.

== Marriage ==
She married Henry Pelham-Clinton, 7th Duke of Newcastle, in 1889, with whom she shared several common interests. Both were interested in animals, with horses and dogs being their favourites. Prior to the marriage, Kathleen was already a judge and dog show exhibitor, primarily of Fox Terriers. The Duke knew of the Duchess's knowledge of dogs, and when a dealer attempted to sell him a spaniel he once said "It would not suit me to do that. Her Grace knows the market value just a bit too well to suit my fancy." The couple had no children.

== Dogs and kennels ==
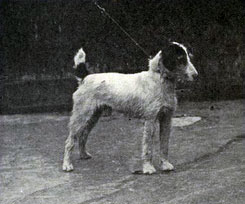
Christopher of Notts, a Smooth Fox Terrier owned by the Duchess of Newcastle

Charles Henry Lane wrote in his 1902 work Dog Shows and Doggy People of the popularity of the Duchess of Newcastle amongst those involved in dog shows, being the "most popular of her sex" apart from the Queen. The book itself was dedicated to the Duchess, with an image of her as the frontispiece. The Duchess was involved in the breeding of several different dog breeds, including Borzois, Fox Terriers (both Smooth and Wire), Whippets, Scottish Deerhounds and Clumber Spaniels; the breed named after the ancestral home of the Dukes of Newcastle. She was a well-known conformation show judge of the breeds she was involved with.

The Duchess was first introduced to dogs when her mother was given a Borzoi named Spain as a gift from the Spanish Marquis of Quandelmina. With no quarantine laws in the United Kingdom at the time, and with sufficient funds, she was able to build up a kennel of imported dogs, with the last dog imported before the quarantine started being Ch. Tsaretsa. Sixteen of Tsar Nicholas II of Russia's Borzois were brought to England to participate in Crufts in 1892, and although they were described as "badly constructed", the Duchess purchased Oudar, thought to be the best of the lot, for £200, a sum equivalent to £19,818 in 2010.

She bred eight Borzoi champions and owned a further five. These included the Russian-bred Ch. Milka, who was the first bitch champion of the breed, and the first British bitch champion, Ch. Vikhra. Her dog Ch. Tsaretsa won 17 CCs, a record held until World War I. Ch. Tsaretsa was bred to Ch. Velsk, producing three champion dogs in a single litter. Her dog Ch. Podar of Notts was one of the most influential Borzois of all time, and the majority of modern dogs of the breed can be traced back to him in some way.

She became President of the Wire Fox Terrier Association between 1916 and 1919, remaining a member for the rest of her life. The Association considers her "of Notts" strain to be the foundation strain of the modern Wire Fox Terrier. The Duchess wrote of her work in breeding the Wire Fox Terrier, and this was published in 1928. Between 1900 and 1923, the Duchess bred twelve Wire Fox Terrier champions, the first being the highly influential Ch. Cackler of Notts who is considered to be an ancestor of every Wire Fox Terrier in the world. She judged the Best in Show class for the National Terrier Show in 1948, selecting the Wire Fox Terrier Ch. Arley Miss Quality as the winner. She also bred nine Smooth Fox Terriers, and purchased another two.

== Later life and death ==
Upon her death in 1955, the Duchess bequeathed a variety of cups and paintings to The Kennel Club, including an oil on canvas painting of a Borzoi by William Frank Calderon. She left her show dogs to her kennel man and her house dogs to her maid.
