= Dublin Artisans' Dwellings Company =

Defunct housing project in Dublin

- Founded: 1876
- Headquarters: Dublin, Ireland
- Key people: Sir William Findlater

Dublin Artisans' Dwellings Company known as DADC was a semi-philanthropic private enterprise established to build better quality housing in Dublin.

== History ==
The Dublin Artisans' Dwellings Company (DADC) was founded in June 1876 in response to the shortage of suitable housing for the working class in Dublin at affordable rents. It specifically aimed to build housing for those in full-time employment in artisan occupations and other trades. The founders of the DADC were Quaker and Protestant businessmen, including the Guinness family, paying out small dividends to its shareholders. Among the directors of the DADC was William Findlater. The company raised capital through selling shares and government loans. Its offices were built at 12-13 South William Street circa 1906.

The DADC was most active in building during the 1880s and 1890s, initially buildings flats but these did not prove popular. With modest funds, the DADC bought land at low cost, for example from Dublin Corporation for cost price. Their housing developments were popular, consisting of single-storey cottages and two-storey terraced houses. As a cost saving measure, a small number of housing designs were used repeatedly across different building schemes. The DADC selected their tenants, who were predominantly Protestant, with a large number of Dublin Metropolitan Police and army among their tenants. Between 1879 and 1908, the company built 3,300 homes for 16,000 tenants. The rents were always considered competitively high.

The DADC's building projects were placed on hold during World War I, and were delayed in recommencing due to later rent strikes, with 3 further developments built between 1929 and 1933. Facing competition from local authority housing, the DADC started to sell off its houses from 1961 and concentrated on investing in commercial property. The last of the houses were sold in 1979, and the company was renamed DAD Properties LTD. It was taken over by Rohan Holdings in 1984.

The archive of the DADC is held in the Irish Architectural Archive.

== Notable developments ==
- Buckingham Buildings, purpose built tenements on Buckingham Street Upper (1876)
- Crampton Buildings, Temple Bar (1891)
- The Echlin Buildings, built 1878 on Echlin Street
- Harold's Cross Cottages (1884)
- Temple Buildings, built 1978 on Dominick Street Upper
