= County Monaghan (UK Parliament constituency) =

UK parliamentary constituency in Ireland, 1801–1885

- Former county constituency for the House of Commons
- County: County Monaghan

1801–1885
- Seats: 2
- Created from: County Monaghan (IHC)
- Replaced by: North Monaghan and South Monaghan

County Monaghan is a former parliamentary constituency in Ireland, returning two Members of Parliament (MPs) to the House of Commons of the Parliament of the United Kingdom.

== Boundaries ==
This constituency comprised the whole of County Monaghan.

== Members of Parliament ==
Year	1st Member	1st Party	2nd Member	2nd Party
1801	Richard Dawson		Warner Westenra	
1801	Richard Dawson		Charles Powell Leslie II	
1807	Thomas Corry		Charles Powell Leslie II	
1812	Richard Dawson		Charles Powell Leslie II	
1813	Thomas Corry		Charles Powell Leslie II	
1818	Henry Westenra	Whig	Charles Powell Leslie II	
1826	Henry Westenra	Whig	Evelyn Shirley	Tory
1830	Cadwallader Blayney	Tory	Evelyn Shirley	Tory
1831	Cadwallader Blayney	Tory	Henry Westenra	Whig
1832	Cadwallader Blayney	Tory	Louis Perrin	Whig
1834	Henry Westenra	Whig	Louis Perrin	Whig
1834, July	Edward Lucas	Tory	Louis Perrin	Whig
1834, December	Edward Lucas	Conservative	Louis Perrin	Whig
1835	Edward Lucas	Conservative	Henry Westenra	Whig
1841	Evelyn Shirley	Conservative	Henry Westenra	Whig
1843	Evelyn Shirley	Conservative	Charles Powell Leslie III	Conservative
1847	Thomas Vesey Dawson	Whig	Charles Powell Leslie III	Conservative
1852	Sir George Forster, Bt	Conservative	Charles Powell Leslie III	Conservative
1865	Vesey Dawson (known as Viscount Cremorne from July 1866)	Liberal	Charles Powell Leslie III	Conservative
1868	Sewallis Shirley	Conservative	Charles Powell Leslie III	Conservative
1871	Sewallis Shirley	Conservative	John Leslie	Conservative
1880	John Givan	Liberal	William Findlater	Liberal
1883	Tim Healy	Irish Parliamentary	William Findlater	Liberal
1885	constituency abolished: see North Monaghan and South Monaghan			

== Election results ==
=== Elections in the 1830s ===
General election 1830: Monaghan
Party	Candidate	Votes	%	±%
Tory	Cadwallader Blayney	631	38.6	
Tory	Evelyn Shirley, Snr.	472	28.9	
Whig	Henry Westenra	405	24.8	
Whig	John Westenra	78	4.8	
Whig	Arthur Gamble Lewis	48	2.9	
Majority		67	4.1	
Turnout		852	74.2	
Registered electors		1,148		
Tory hold		Swing		
Tory gain from Whig		Swing		

General election 1831: Monaghan
Party	Candidate	Votes	%
Tory	Cadwallader Blayney	Unopposed	
Whig	Henry Westenra	Unopposed	
Registered electors		1,148	
Tory hold			
Whig gain from Tory			

General election 1832: Monaghan
Party	Candidate	Votes	%
Whig	Louis Perrin	1,454	41.6
Tory	Cadwallader Blayney	1,039	29.7
Whig	Henry Westenra	1,005	28.7
Turnout		2,028	94.8
Registered electors		2,139	
Majority		415	11.9
Whig hold			
Majority		34	1.0
Tory hold			

Blayney succeeded to the peerage, becoming 12th Baron Blayney and causing a by-election.

By-election, 17 May 1834: Monaghan
Party	Candidate	Votes	%	±%
Whig	Henry Westenra	1,078	52.3	−18.0
Tory	Edward Lucas	984	47.7	+18.0
Majority		94	4.6	−7.3
Turnout		2,062	c. 96.4	c. +1.6
Registered electors		c. 2,139		
Whig gain from Tory		Swing	−18.0	

- On petition, Westenra's poll was amended to 973 votes and Lucas was declared elected on 30 July 1834

General election 1835: Monaghan
Party	Candidate	Votes	%	±%
Conservative	Edward Lucas	914	53.3	+23.6
Whig	Henry Westenra	733	42.7	+1.1
Whig	William Elliott Hudson	66	3.8	−24.9
Whig	David Leslie	2	0.1	N/A
Turnout		1,024	41.4	−53.4
Registered electors		2,472		
Majority		181	10.6	+9.6
Conservative hold		Swing	+23.6	
Majority		667	38.9	+27.0
Whig hold		Swing	−5.4	

General election 1837: Monaghan
Party	Candidate	Votes	%
Conservative	Edward Lucas	Unopposed	
Whig	Henry Westenra	Unopposed	
Registered electors		3,194	
Conservative hold			
Whig hold			

=== Elections in the 1840s ===
General election 1841: Monaghan
Party	Candidate	Votes	%	±%
Whig	Henry Westenra	Unopposed		
Conservative	Evelyn Shirley	Unopposed		
Registered electors		2,169		
Whig hold				
Conservative hold				

Westenra succeeded to the peerage, becoming 3rd Baron Rossmore and causing a by-election.

By-election, 17 February 1843: Monaghan
Party	Candidate	Votes	%	±%
Conservative	Charles Powell Leslie	Unopposed		
Conservative gain from Whig				

General election 1847: Monaghan
Party	Candidate	Votes	%	±%
Whig	Thomas Vesey Dawson	Unopposed		
Conservative	Charles Powell Leslie	Unopposed		
Registered electors		2,351		
Whig hold				
Conservative hold				

=== Elections in the 1850s ===
General election 1852: Monaghan
Party	Candidate	Votes	%	±%
Conservative	Charles Powell Leslie	1,948	37.1	N/A
Conservative	George Forster	1,900	36.1	N/A
Independent Irish	John Gray	1,409	26.8	New
Majority		491	9.3	N/A
Turnout		3,333 (est)	80.9 (est)	N/A
Registered electors		4,119		
Conservative hold		Swing	N/A	
Conservative gain from Whig		Swing	N/A	

General election 1857: Monaghan
Party	Candidate	Votes	%	±%
Conservative	Charles Powell Leslie	Unopposed		
Conservative	George Forster	Unopposed		
Registered electors		5,093		
Conservative hold				
Conservative hold				

General election 1859: Monaghan
Party	Candidate	Votes	%	±%
Conservative	Charles Powell Leslie	Unopposed		
Conservative	George Forster	Unopposed		
Registered electors		5,121		
Conservative hold				
Conservative hold				

=== Elections in the 1860s ===
General election 1865: Monaghan
Party	Candidate	Votes	%	±%
Conservative	Charles Powell Leslie	2,551	35.6	N/A
Liberal	Vesey Dawson	2,397	33.4	New
Conservative	George Forster	2,218	30.9	N/A
Liberal	Edward James Stanley	3	0.1	New
Turnout		4,782 (est)	89.4 (est)	N/A
Registered electors		5,350		
Majority		154	2.2	N/A
Conservative hold		Swing	N/A	
Majority		179	2.5	N/A
Liberal gain from Conservative		Swing	N/A	

General election 1868: Monaghan
Party	Candidate	Votes	%	±%
Conservative	Charles Powell Leslie	3,130	45.5	+9.9
Conservative	Sewallis Shirley	2,785	40.5	+9.6
Liberal	William Gray	960	14.0	−19.5
Majority		1,825	26.5	+24.3
Turnout		3,918 (est)	70.1 (est)	−19.3
Registered electors		5,591		
Conservative hold		Swing	+9.8	
Conservative gain from Liberal		Swing	+9.7	

=== Elections in the 1870s ===
Leslie's death caused a by-election.

By-election, 22 Jul 1871: Monaghan
Party	Candidate	Votes	%	±%
Conservative	John Leslie	2,538	63.6	−22.4
Home Rule	Isaac Butt	1,451	36.4	New
Majority		1,087	27.2	+0.7
Turnout		3,989	70.9	+0.8
Registered electors		5,623		
Conservative hold		Swing		

General election 1874: Monaghan
Party	Candidate	Votes	%	±%
Conservative	John Leslie	2,481	35.4	−10.1
Conservative	Sewallis Shirley	2,417	34.5	−6.0
Home Rule	John Madden	2,105	30.1	N/A
Majority		312	4.5	−22.0
Turnout		4,554 (est)	81.9 (est)	+11.8
Registered electors		5,559		
Conservative hold		Swing		
Conservative hold		Swing		

=== Elections in the 1880s ===
General election 1880: Monaghan
Party	Candidate	Votes	%	±%
Liberal	John Givan	2,818	29.4	New
Liberal	William Findlater	2,545	26.6	New
Conservative	John Leslie	2,117	22.1	−13.3
Conservative	Sewallis Shirley	2,099	21.9	−12.6
Majority		428	4.5	N/A
Turnout		4,790 (est)	87.1 (est)	+5.2
Registered electors		5,496		
Liberal gain from Conservative		Swing		
Liberal gain from Conservative		Swing		

Givan was appointed Crown Solicitor for Kildare and Meath, causing a by-election.

By-election, 30 June 1883: Monaghan
Party	Candidate	Votes	%	±%
Irish Parliamentary	Tim Healy	2,376	51.0	New
Conservative	John Monroe	2,011	43.1	−0.9
Liberal	Henry Pringle	274	5.9	−50.1
Majority		365	7.9	N/A
Turnout		4,661	88.3	+1.2 (est)
Registered electors		5,281		
Irish Parliamentary gain from Liberal		Swing		
