= Richard Blayney, 4th Baron Blayney =

Anglo-Irish politician and official (died 1670)

Richard Blayney, 4th Baron Blayney (died 1670) was an Anglo-Irish politician and official.

Blayney was the third son of Henry Blayney, 2nd Baron Blayney and Jane Moore. In 1656, he was appointed Custos Rotulorum of County Monaghan by Oliver Cromwell, and that year also took his seat in the Second Protectorate Parliament as the Member of Parliament for Cavan, Fermanagh and Monaghan. On 9 February 1659, he was appointed Escheator of Ulster by Richard Cromwell. Following the Stuart Restoration, Blayney was elected as the representative for County Monaghan in the Irish House of Commons, serving between 1661 and 1666. In 1669, he inherited his elder brother's peerage as Baron Blayney; he died the following year.

Parliament of Ireland
Preceded by Protectorate Parliament	Member of Parliament for County Monaghan; 1661–1666; With: John Foster	Succeeded by Dacres Barrett; William Barton
Peerage of Ireland
Preceded by Edward Blayney	Baron Blayney; 1669–1670	Succeeded by Henry Vincent Blayney
