= John Montgomery (died 1741) =

Irish politician

John Montgomery (c.1719 – November 1741) M.P. for County Monaghan, Ireland from October 1741 until his death a month later in November 1741. He was succeeded as Monaghan M.P. by his younger brother General Alexander Montgomery (died 1785).

He was the eldest son of John Montgomery (died 1733) of Ballyleck, County Monaghan (Member of Parliament for Monaghan and second son of Colonel Alexander Montgomery (1667–1722) after succeeding his father to Ballyleck Estate when his elder brother Thomas Montgomery (Politician) was disinherited for marrying an Englishwoman).

His mother was Mary Coxe, a Maid of Honour to Queen Caroline, wife of King George II of Great Britain. Mary Coxe's father was also the Queen's physician and governor of New Jersey, Dr Daniel Coxe.

Montgomery's first cousin was the American Revolution war-hero Major-General Richard Montgomery.
