= Jean Baptiste Perrin (fl. 1786) =

Jean Baptiste Perrin (fl. 1786–1798) was a tutor and educational author. Born in France, he moved to Dublin and became a teacher of French. He often resided for months at a time in the houses such as that of the Irish gentry as desired to acquire a knowledge of the French tongue.

He mixed in the political agitations of the period, and on 26 April 1784 was elected an honorary member of the Sons of the Shamrock; and is said in 1795 to have joined in the invitation to the French government to invade Ireland. In his later years he resided at Leinster Lodge, near Athy, County Kildare. The date of his death is not given; but he was buried in the old churchyard at Palmerstown.

He had at least one child, Louis Perrin, a judge, who was born at Waterford in 1782.

== Published works ==
He was the author of:

- The French Student's Vade-mecum, London, 1750.
- Grammar of the French Tongue, 1768.
- Fables Amusantes, 1771.
- Entertaining and Instructive Exercises, with the Rules of the French Syntax, 1773.
- The Elements of French Conversation, with Dialogues, 1774.
- Lettres Choisies sur toutes sortes de sujet, 1777.
- The Practice of the French Pronunciation alphabetically exhibited, 1777.
- La Bonne Mère, contenant de petites pièces dramatiques, 1786.
- The Elements of English Conversation, with a Vocabulary in French, English, and Italian, Naples, 1814.

The majority of these works went to many editions, and the Fables were adapted to the Hamiltonian system in 1825.
