= James Hamilton (language teacher) =

British educationalist, language teacher (1769-1829)

James Hamilton (1769–1829) was an Irish language teacher, who introduced the "Hamiltonian system" of teaching languages.

== Life ==
Hamilton was taught for four years at a Dublin school run by two Jesuits, Beatty and Mulhall. He went into business, and for about three years before the French Revolution was living in France.

In 1798 Hamilton was established as a merchant in Hamburg, and went for instruction in German to General D'Angeli, a French émigré. D'Angeli, without using a grammar book, translated to him word for word a German book of anecdotes, parsing as he proceeded; and after about twelve lessons Hamilton found that he could read some German books. Beatty and Mulhall had had a somewhat similar system.

Moving to Paris Hamilton with the banking-house of Karcher & Co., did business with England at the time of the Peace of Amiens. At the end of the Peace in 1803 he was detained, and his business was ruined.

Hamilton went to New York in October 1815, with the idea of becoming a farmer and manufacturing potash. He changed his mind, and began to teach languages. His method started with a word-for-word translation, and left instruction in grammar till a later stage. His first pupils were three ministers and Judge William P. Van Ness of the District Court; he charged a dollar a lesson, and taught pupils to read French in 24 lessons of four hours each.

In September 1816 Hamilton went to Philadelphia, and gave a lecture on the "Hamiltonian System". In 1817 he moved on to Baltimore, his wife and daughters teaching with him. The professors at Baltimore College ridiculed him in a play, The New Mode of Teaching, acted by their pupils. Hamilton went to the play, and three days later published it in a newspaper, with his own comments. He claimed a Hamiltonian school at Baltimore, with more than 160 pupils and 20 teachers. Bad health and money troubles meant he went on to Washington.

At Boston, Hamilton could only obtain four pupils. A professor at Boston University attacked him as a charlatan, but a committee examined his pupils, and he soon had 200. He taught also at colleges in Schenectady, Princeton, Yale, Hartford, and Middleburg.

In 1822 Hamilton went to Montreal, and then to Quebec. At Montreal he instructed a gaoler, and then successfully taught reading to eight English prisoners there. He left the United States in July 1823, and came to London, where in eighteen months he had more than 600 pupils learning different languages, and seven teachers. He left his school to the teachers, and afterwards taught his system in Liverpool, Manchester, Edinburgh, Dublin, Belfast, and at least other places. In London he taught at his house, No. 25 Cecil Street, Strand, and then in Gower Street.

As an experiment over six months in 1825 saw ten school boys live in Hamilton's house. At the end of the period they were examined in Latin translation, French and Italian. The expenses of this experiment were partly borne by John Smith, M.P. Hamilton's system and extensive advertising were attacked by school-masters and others. A defence by Sydney Smith appeared in the Edinburgh Review for June 1826. The Hamiltonian system was also defended in the Westminster Review.

Hamilton died in Dublin on 16 September 1829, at age 60.

== Works ==
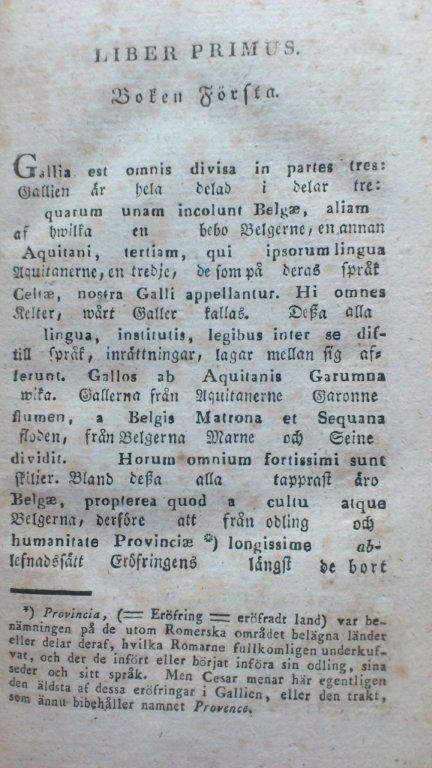
Hamiltonian system, interlinear Swedish text for De Bello Gallico

In Philadelphia Hamilton printed his first reading-book, chapters i–iii. of St. John's Gospel, in French, with an interlinear translation. Further books with literal and interlinear English translations published by Hamilton, and mostly of gospels and classics, appeared in Ancient Greek, Latin including Charles François Lhomond's Epitome Historiæ Sacræ, French including Jean Baptiste Perrin's Fables, German including Joachim Heinrich Campe's Robinson Crusoe, and Italian. In time unauthorised books appeared, professing to be adapted to his system.
