= John Givan =

Irish politician

John Givan (29 September 1837 – 21 January 1895) was an Irish Liberal politician who sat in the House of Commons from 1880 to 1883.

Givan was the son of John Givan of Castlecaulfield, County Tyrone, and his wife Margaretta daughter of James Macdonnell. His father was a prominent linen manufacturer. Givan was educated at private schools and became a solicitor in 1870. He was J.P. for Aughnacloy and chairman of the Aughnacloy town commissioners.

At the 1880 general election Givan was elected as one of the two Members of Parliament (MPs) for County Monaghan. He held the seat until 1883, when he resigned to take up an appointment as Crown Solicitor for the County Meath and County Louth and for the town of Drogheda.

He was a trustee of Magee College, Derry.

He died at Martray Manor, Ballygawley, County Tyrone at the age of 57.

Givan married firstly Eliza Hopper, daughter of Samuel Hopper, secondly in 1878 Araminta Reid Ross, daughter of James M Ross of Liscarney Monaghan, and thirdly in 1894, Emily Cooke, daughter of Rev. William Cooke of Kilkenny.

Parliament of the United Kingdom
Preceded by Sewallis Shirley; John Leslie	Member of Parliament for County Monaghan; 1880 – 1883; With: William Findlater	Succeeded by William Findlater; Tim Healy
