= William Findlater (Irish politician) =

Irish politician

Findlater in 1880

Sir William Findlater (1824–1906) was an Irish Liberal politician who sat in the House of Commons from 1880 to 1885.

Findlater was the son of William Findlater, a merchant of Derry. He became a solicitor in 1846 and was also a partner in the Mountjoy Brewery. In 1878, he was elected president of the Incorporated Law Society of Ireland, for which he was knighted.

He served as a director of the Dublin Artisans' Dwellings Company.

At the 1880 general election Findlater was elected Member of Parliament for County Monaghan. He held the seat until 1885. He was president of the Statistical and Social Inquiry Society of Ireland between 1891 and 1894.

Findlater married firstly in 1853 Mary Jane Wolfe, daughter of John Wolfe a solicitor of Dublin, and secondly Marion Park, daughter of Lieutenant Colonel Archibald Park of the Indian Army.

Findlater died at the age of 81.

Parliament of the United Kingdom
Preceded by Sewallis Shirley; John Leslie	Member of Parliament for County Monaghan; 1880 – 1885; With: John Givan 1880–83; Tim Healy 1883–85	Constituency divided
