= Alexander Montgomery (1720–1800) =

Irish politician

Colonel Alexander John Montgomery (1720 – 29 September 1800) was an Irish politician.

He was born in 1720, the eldest son of Thomas Montgomery, M.P. for Lifford, and his wife Mary Franklin. His youngest brother was the American Revolution war-hero, Major-General Richard Montgomery.

He was elected Member of Parliament as an Independent for County Donegal in the general election of 1768 and represented that constituency until August 1800. He was also High Sheriff of Donegal in 1773.

He had two nicknames. He was first called "Black Montgomery" because of a scalping incident in the Seven Years' War in Canada and later in life he was called "Old Sandy" to distinguish him from his cousin Alexander Montgomery (died 1785) (Young Sandy) who was a year younger and who represented County Monaghan in the Irish Parliament at the same time as Old Sandy.

He was a captain in the British Army's 43rd Regiment of Foot, which served in America. His regiment was part of General James Wolfe's attack on French Quebec in 1759. Lieutenant Malcolm Fraser of the 48th Regiment of Foot asserted that on 23 August 1759, his detachment was brought under the command of Alexander Montgomery for an attack on a village near Saint-Joachim. Fraser states in his journal:

There were several of the enemy killed and wounded, and a few prisoners taken, all of whom the barbarous Captain Montgomery, who commanded us, ordered to be butchered in a most inhuman and cruel manner. One was shot and another knocked down with a tomahawk and both scalped in my absence.

Montgomery resigned from the British Army in 1763 because a junior officer was promoted over him. He was also a Colonel in the Raphoe Battalion of the Volunteers and was their delegate at the Dungannon Convention.

Montgomery won his last election in 1797 by releasing Republican freeholders from Lifford Gaol to vote for him. He joined the Royal Dublin Society in 1773. Montgomery was noted for his duelling. Among his opponents was Francis Mansfield, the High Sheriff of Donegal in 1788. On one occasion while duelling in the bishop's garden in Derry, his opponent's first pistol-round shot off the tails of Montgomery's swallow-tailed coat. Undeterred, Montgomery finished the duel sitting in a chair in order to conceal his bare posterior. In 1797 he won a duel with a Donegal loyalist and was carried home in triumph to Convoy by the United Irishmen.

Montgomery was suspect in government circles. In 1773 he was described as "extremely popular and very flighty". "The Irish Parliament 1775" states- "Lord Townshend attempted, and Lord Harcourt obtained for him in Council a Port of Discharge at Letterkenny. He came into Parliament upon Popular Ground in the County. He stands by & court the Government his Support but even after all that has been done his support is very doubtfull. However during the last Session he was pretty steady. Mr. Montgomery has got to his Recommendation Two Boatmen, a Tidewaiter Surveyor of the Lough Swilley Barge and a Hearth Money Collection". Sketches of the Members of the Irish Parliament in 1782 stated- "Alexander Montgomery Esq., member for Donegall County has a good estate in this county-brother to the rebel Montgomery who was killed at Quebec-concerned much in the North-West Fisheries-an impracticable and dangerous man-an advocate for Mr. Flood's doctrine of Renunciation. It is supposed he will leave his fortune to one of Lord Ranelagh's children, to whom his sister is married. Lord Carlisle obliged him by allowing him to name some officers in the Port of Ballyraine, for which favour he often supported". He was vehemently opposed to the 1800 Act of Union between the Kingdom of Ireland and the Kingdom of Great Britain and voted against it.

He died unmarried on 29 September 1800, at the age of 80, before the Acts of Union became law and on his tombstone in the churchyard of Raphoe Cathedral is inscribed: "Sacred to the memory of Alex Montgomery of Convoy who represented this once Independent county in Parliament for 32 years."

== Arms ==
Coat of arms of Alexander Montgomery
Notes Granted posthumously by Sir Chichester Fortescue, Ulster King of Arms, 20 September 1808, on petition by Alexander's son Henry Conyngham Montgomery. Crest On a chapeau Gules turned up Ermine a cubit arm armed grasping a broken tilting spear Proper. Escutcheon Quarterly 1st & 4th Azure three fleurs-de-lus Or two and one 2nd & 3rd Gules three annulets Or gemmed Azure two and one all within a bordure Argent charged with shamrocks Vert on an escutcheon surtout Argent a tilting spear and sword in saltire Proper. Motto Gardez Bien
