= William Francis de Vismes Kane =

English entomologist

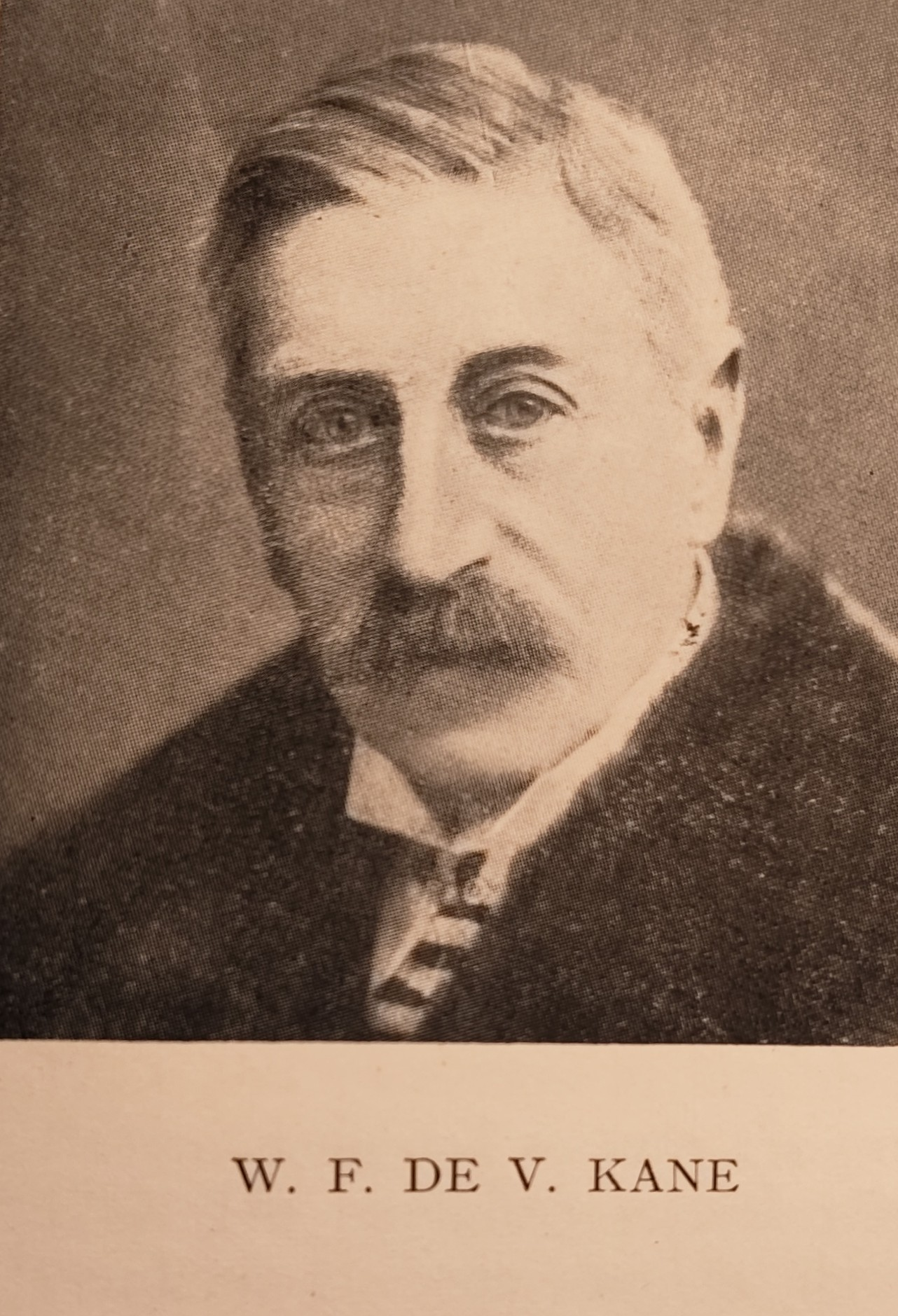
- Born: 9 April 1840; Exmouth, Devon, England
- Died: 18 April 1918 (aged 78); Drumreaske House, County Monaghan
- Occupation: entomologist

William Francis de Vismes Kane (9 April 1840 – 18 April 1918) was an English entomologist who lived and worked in Ireland.

== Early life and family ==
Born in Exmouth, Devon, England, Kane attended school in London and Gloucester before moving to Ireland to study arts and engineering at Trinity College Dublin. His father was Joseph Kane, and his mother was French. He married Amelia-Maria-Jane Hamilton on 2 September 1862, and lived at Drumreaske House in Monaghan. They had one son, Joseph-George-Auriol (born 29 June 1865), and one daughter, Emmeline-Rosa-Margaret. He moved back to England in 1901.

== Career ==
He was appointed Sheriff of Monaghan, the British monarch's representative in the county, in 1865.

Most of Kane's collecting was in Monaghan and at Favour Royal in County Tyrone, but his collection contains insects from the entirety of Ireland as well as an extensive collection of world butterflies. In 1876, he left Ireland due to illness and lived variously in France, Italy, and Switzerland where he continued to collect, eventually returning to Ireland in 1879. In 1901, after the death of his wife, Kane abruptly gave up entomology and moved back to England, leaving his collection to the National Museum of Ireland. In 1902, Kane remarried while living in Kent. In the following years he travelled extensively, including to Egypt and Palestine.

Kane died in April 1918, while staying in Drumreaske House. His friend, British entomologist George Herbert Carpenter, said Kane possessed "vigour and energy to the very end of his long life", describing Kane as a "delightful companion in natural history field-work, knowing much about many subjects and ready to convey information to all who consulted him".

Drumreaske House eventually fell into disrepair and is derelict today.

== Works ==
- A Catalogue of the Lepidoptera of Ireland. London. West, Newman & Co. 166pp. Fine coloured frontis of 15 varieties of Irish Lepidoptera. 1901.
- European Butterflies. London. Macmillan. 184pp. 1885.

== Arms ==
Coat of arms of William Francis de Vismes Kane

Notes
Confirmed by John Bernard Burke, British genealogist and Ulster King of Arms, 30 December 1863.
Crest
A naked arm embowed Proper charged with an estoile Gules and holding in the hand a sword also Proper.
Escutcheon
Gules three fishes hauriant Argent on the centre chief point an estoile Or.
Motto
(This Hand For My Country)

== Sources ==
- Anonym 1918: [Kane, W. F. V.] - Ent. Rec. J. Var. 30 157
- Anonym 1919: [Kane, W. F. V.] - Ent. News 30 209
- Edwards, S. 1918–1919: [Kane, W. F. de Vismes] - Proc. Soc. London Ent. & N. H. Soc. : 36
- Gardner, W. 1918: [Kane, W. F. V.] - Entomologist's Monthly Magazine (3) 54 254-255
- H. R. B. 1918: [Kane, W. F. V.] - Ent. 51 240
