= Edward Lucas (died 1871) =

British politician (1787–1871)

Edward Lucas (27 September 1787 – 12 November 1871) was an Irish landowner and politician in County Monaghan.

== Biography ==
He was the only child of Charles Lucas, High Sheriff of Monaghan in 1795; Edward Lucas MP was his grandfather. In 1796 he succeeded his father in the family estate of Castle Shane. He was High Sheriff for Monaghan in 1818, and represented County Monaghan in Parliament from 1834 to 1841. From 1841 to 1846, he served as Under-Secretary for Ireland, and in 1845 he was appointed to the Irish Privy Council.

In 1812 Lucas married Anne, daughter of William Ruxton of Ardee. They had five sons (including Gould Arthur Lucas) and three daughters. On his death he was succeeded at Castle Shane by his eldest son Edward William; his widow died on 15 August 1880.

Parliament of the United Kingdom
Preceded by Henry Westenra; Louis Perrin	Member of Parliament for County Monaghan; 1834–1841; With: Louis Perrin to 1835; Henry Westenra from 1835	Succeeded by Evelyn Shirley; Henry Westenra
