= Louis Perrin =

Irish barrister, politician and judge

Louis Perrin PC (15 February 1782 – 7 December 1864) was an Irish barrister, politician and judge.

== Early life ==
Perrin was born in Waterford, the son of Jean Baptiste Perrin. Jean Baptiste, a Frenchman, had come to Ireland to seek a living: he set himself up as a teacher of French, and earned his living mainly as a private tutor to wealthy Irish families.

Louis Perrin was educated at the diocesan school at Armagh. Removing to Trinity College Dublin, he was elected a Scholar there in 1799, and graduated B.A. in 1801. At the trial of his fellow student, Robert Emmet, in 1803, when the sentence of death was pronounced, Perrin rushed forward in the court and warmly embraced the prisoner.

He devoted himself with great energy to the study of mercantile law; in Hilary term 1806 was called to the bar, and was soon much employed in cases where penalties for breaches of the revenue laws were sought to be enforced.

When Watty Cox, the proprietor and publisher of Cox's Magazine was prosecuted by the government for a libel in 1811, O'Connell, Burke, Bethel, and Perrin were employed for the defence; but the case was practically conducted by the junior, who showed marked ability in the matter.

He was also junior counsel, in 1811, in the prosecution of Sheridan, Kirwan, and the Roman Catholic delegates for violating the Convention Act.

In 1832, he became a bencher of King's Inns, Dublin.

== Politics ==
He was a Whig in politics, supported Catholic emancipation, and acquired the sobriquet of "Honest Louis Perrin". On 6 May 1831, in conjunction with Sir Robert Harty, he was elected as Member of Parliament (MP) for Dublin City.

Being unseated in August, he was returned to the House of Commons for County Monaghan at the general election on 24 December 1832, displacing Henry Robert Westenra, the previous Tory member.

At the next general election, in 1835, he came in for the city of Cashel, on 14 January 1835, but resigned the following August, to take his seat on the bench. In the House of Commons he strove to prevent grand jury jobbery, and made an able speech on introducing the Irish municipal reform bill; and he was untiring in his efforts to check intemperance by advocating regulations closing public houses at eleven o'clock at night.

From 7 February 1832 to February 1835, he was Third Serjeant, from February to April 1835 First Serjeant, and on 29 April 1835, on the recommendation of the Marquis of Normanby, he succeeded Francis Blackburne as Attorney-General. While a serjeant he presided over the inquiry into the old Irish corporations, and on his report the Municipal Corporations (Ireland) Act 1840 was passed.

After the death of Thomas Burton Vandeleur, he was appointed a puisne justice of the Court of King's Bench, on 31 August 1835. In the same year, he was gazetted a privy councillor. He was most painstaking in the discharge of his important functions; and, despite some peculiarities of manner, may be regarded as one of the ablest and upright judges who have sat on the Irish bench. He resigned on a pension in February 1860, and resided at Knockdromin near Rush, County Dublin, where he frequently attended the petty sessions.

He died at his residence Knockdromin House, near Rush, on 7 December 1864, and was buried at Lusk, on 10 December. Knockdromin was destroyed in an arson attack in 2011.

== Family ==
He married, in April 1815, Hester Connor Stewart, daughter of the Rev. Abraham Augustus Stewart, chaplain to the Royal Hibernian School, Dublin and his wife Frances Connor of County Donegal, by whom he had seven sons, including James, a major in the army, who fell at Lucknow in 1857; Louis, rector of Garrycloyne, Blarney, County Cork; William, chief registrar of the Irish Court of Bankruptcy (d 1892); Charles, major of the 66th foot from 1865; Mark, registrar of judgments in Ireland; and John, of Fortfield House, Terenure, father of the well-known painter Mary Perrin.

Parliament of the United Kingdom
Preceded by George Moore; Frederick Shaw	Member of Parliament for Dublin City; 1831–1831; With: Robert Harty	Succeeded by Viscount Ingestre; Frederick Shaw
Preceded by Cadwallader Blayney; Henry Westenra	Member of Parliament for County Monaghan; 1832–1835; With: Cadwallader Blayney to 1834; Henry Westenra May–July 1834; Edward Lucas from July 1834	Succeeded by Edward Lucas; Henry Westenra
Preceded by James Roe	Member of Parliament for Cashel; January 1835 – September 1835	Succeeded by Stephen Woulfe
Legal offices
Vacant Title last held by Francis Blackburne	Attorney-General for Ireland; April 1835 – August 1835	Succeeded by Michael O'Loghlen
