= Charles Powell Leslie (1731–1800) =

Irish landowner and politician (1731–1800)

Charles Leslie
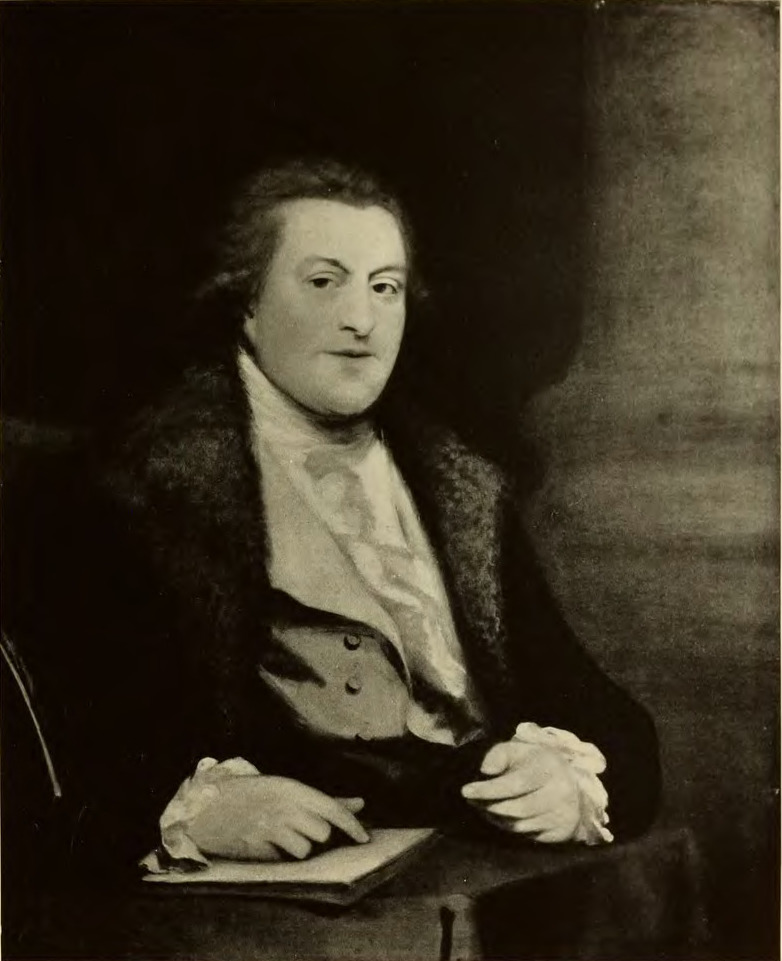
- Portrait by Gilbert Stuart

Member of the Irish Parliament for Hillsborough
- In office 1771–1776

Member of the Irish Parliament for County Monaghan
- In office 1783–1800

Personal details
- Born: 1731
- Died: August 1800 (aged 68–69)
- Spouse: Hon. Prudence Hill-Trevor
- Children: 12, including Charles and John
- Parent(s): Robert Leslie; Frances Ludlow
- Relatives: Rev. Charles Leslie (grandfather)

Charles Powell Leslie (1731–1800), of Castle Leslie, Glaslough, County Monaghan, was an Irish landowner and politician. He was member of the Irish Parliament for Hillsborough (1771–1776) and County Monaghan (1783–1800).

He was the son of Robert Leslie and Frances (née Rogerson), daughter of Sir John Rogerson, Lord Chief Justice of Ireland, and Elizabeth Ludlow, niece of the regicide Edmund Ludlow. His grandfather was Rev. Charles Leslie.

In 1765, Leslie married Prudence Penelope, daughter of Arthur Hill-Trevor, 1st Viscount Dungannon and Anne Stafford. His children from this marriage included Charles Powell Leslie and Rev. John Leslie. In 1785, he married Mary Anne (née Tench) with whom he had one son and four daughters.

Leslie was appointed High Sheriff of Wicklow for 1766.

Parliament of the United Kingdom
Preceded by Alexander Montgomery	Member of Parliament for County Monaghan; 1783-1800; With: John Montgomery to 1797; Richard Dawson from 1797	Succeeded by Warner Westenra
