= Henry Westenra, 3rd Baron Rossmore =

Anglo-Irish Member of Parliament and peer (1792–1860)

The Right Honourable The Lord Rossmore
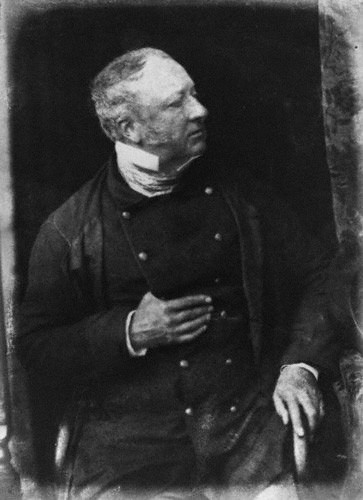
- Rossmore, by the photographer Hill & Adamson

Member of the House of Lords
- Lord Temporal
- In office 10 August 1842 – 1 December 1860
- Preceded by: The 2nd Baron Rossmore
- Succeeded by: The 4th Baron Rossmore

Personal details
- Born: Henry Robert Westenra; 24 August 1792 Walsh Park, County Tipperary
- Died: 1 December 1860 (aged 68)
- Parents: Warner Westenra, 2nd Baron Rossmore (father); Mary Ann Walsh (mother)

Henry Robert Westenra, 3rd Baron Rossmore (24 August 1792 – 1 December 1860), was an Anglo-Irish Member of Parliament and hereditary peer, from 1843 to 1852 Lord Lieutenant of Monaghan.

== Life ==
The eldest son of Warner Westenra, 2nd Baron Rossmore (1765–1842), by his first marriage to Mary Ann Walsh, Henry Robert Westenra was born on 24 August 1792 at his mother's family seat, Walsh Park in County Tipperary. He was educated at Westminster School and Trinity College Dublin, where he matriculated on 4 July 1810. His portrait was painted the same year by John Ferneley (1782–1860), showing him with his dogs and carrying a shotgun.

Westenra was Member of Parliament for County Monaghan from 1818 to 1830, again from 1831 to 1832 and from May to July 1834, and finally from 1835 to 1842. On 10 August 1842, on the death of his father, he succeeded as The 3rd Baron Rossmore, of Monaghan in the County of Monaghan, in the Peerage of Ireland, and as The 2nd Baron Rossmore, of the County of Monaghan, in the Peerage of the United Kingdom, the second title giving him a seat in the House of Lords. From 1843 to 1852 he was Lord Lieutenant of County Monaghan.

A member of a family of individualists, Rossmore was a prolific letter-writer, and his surviving letters have been described as "voluminous, frequently vitriolic, and very instructive".

He was also an accomplished player of the Irish pipes, and was considered to be the equal of a good professional piper. In Twenty Years Recollections of an Irish Police Magistrate (1880), Frank Thorpe Porter recalled an evening when Rossmore

... played several pieces of exquisitely sweet music, interspersed with the most extraordinary imitations. In one, which was named The hare in the Corn, he produced sounds very much resembling the cry of the harriers, and other tones like the notes of a hunting horn, terminating with two or three simulated squeaks, supposed to indicate the capture of the hare.

On 25 January 1820 he married in Edinburgh Anne Douglas-Hamilton (born c. 1796 – died 1844). She was the daughter of Douglas Hamilton, 8th Duke of Hamilton (1756–1799), and Harriet Pye Bennett. In right of this wife Rossmore inherited an estate on the Scottish Isle of Arran.

On 19 May 1846, after the death of his first wife, Rossmore married secondly at Camla Vale, County Monaghan, his cousin Josephine Julia Helen (née Lloyd), with whom he had six children:

- Frances Kathleen (d. 7 August 1925) married Major Henry Augustus Candy on 3 August 1870. Had a son and daughter.
- Norah Josephine Harcourt (d. 13 September 1934) married Maj. Gilbert Stirling on 3 December 1873. No known issue.
- Henry Cairns Westenra, 4th Baron Rossmore (1851–1874)
- Derrick Warner William Westenra, 5th Baron Rossmore (1853–1921)
- Lt. Richard Hamilton (1854–1880)
- Peter Craven (1855–1932). married Innys Maud Eaglesfield Daubeny, daughter of Lansdowne Daubeny, on 30 April 1895. They had two daughters.

According to Rossmore's second son, the fifth baron, "My father's favourite amusements were yachting, shooting and fishing, and, oddly enough, playing the bagpipes, at which he excelled." He also reported that Rossmore had suffered from a very bad stammer.

== Death ==
Lord Rossmore died on 1 December 1860 at his country house in County Monaghan, Rossmore Park, and was buried there on 7 December 1860. The house was abandoned in the 1940s, fell into ruin, and was demolished in 1975.

His granddaughter Kathleen (1872–1955), married The 7th Duke of Newcastle in 1899 and was a dog breeder who influenced the Borzoi and Wire Fox Terrier breeds.

Parliament of the United Kingdom
| Preceded by Thomas Charles Stewart Corry; Charles Powell Leslie II | Member of Parliament for County Monaghan; 1818–1830; With: Charles Powell Leslie II 1818–1826; Evelyn Shirley 1826–1830 | Succeeded by Evelyn Shirley; Cadwallader Blayney |
| Preceded by Evelyn Shirley; Cadwallader Blayney | Member of Parliament for County Monaghan; 1831–1832; With: Cadwallader Blayney | Succeeded by Cadwallader Blayney; Louis Perrin |
| Preceded by Cadwallader Blayney; Louis Perrin | Member of Parliament for County Monaghan; 1834; With: Louis Perrin | Succeeded by Louis Perrin; Edward Lucas |
| Preceded by Louis Perrin; Edward Lucas | Member of Parliament for County Monaghan; 1835–1842; With: Edward Lucas 1835–1841; Evelyn Shirley 1841–1842 | Succeeded by Evelyn Shirley; Charles Powell Leslie III |
Honorary titles
| Preceded by The Lord Rossmore | Lord Lieutenant of Monaghan; 1836–1858 | Succeeded by Charles Powell Leslie III |
Peerage of Ireland
| Preceded by Warner Westenra | Baron Rossmore; 1st creation 1842–1860 | Succeeded by Henry Westenra |
Peerage of the United Kingdom
| Preceded by Warner Westenra | Baron Rossmore; 2nd creation 1842–1860; Member of the House of Lords (1842–1860) | Succeeded by Henry Westenra |
