= Vesey John Dawson =

British Army general

Major-General Vesey John Dawson CVO
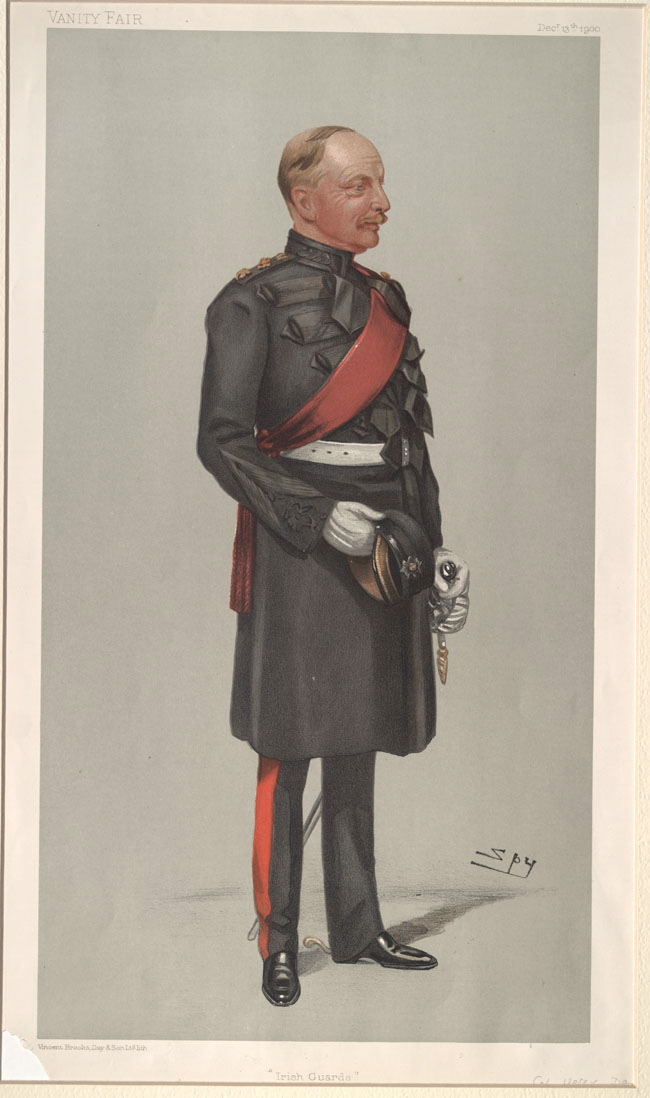
- Dawson caricatured by Spy for Vanity Fair, 1900
- Born: 4 April 1853
- Died: 17 January 1930 (aged 76)
- Relatives: Richard Thomas Dawson, 2nd Baron Cremorne (grandfather); John FitzPatrick, 1st Baron Castletown (grandfather); Brigadier-General Sir Douglas Dawson (brother)
- Military career
- Allegiance: United Kingdom
- Branch: British Army
- Service years: 1871–1914
- Rank: Major-General
- Commands: 2nd London Division; 15th Infantry Brigade; Irish Guards
- Conflicts: Nile Expedition
- Awards: Commander of the Royal Victorian Order

Major-General Vesey John Dawson, CVO (4 April 1853 – 17 January 1930) was a British Army officer.

== Military career ==
Dawson was the eldest son of the Hon. Thomas Vesey Dawson, an officer of the Coldstream Guards who was killed at the Battle of Inkerman; his father was the son of Richard Thomas Dawson, 2nd Baron Cremorne, and his mother the daughter of John FitzPatrick, 1st Baron Castletown. His younger brother, Douglas Dawson, was also an army officer. Vesey Dawson attended Eton College, where his housemaster was Oscar Browning.

Dawson joined the Coldstream Guards in 1871, and served with the Nile Expedition of 1884–85, seeing action at the Battle of Abu Klea. He was promoted to lieutenant-colonel in 1897, and appointed to command the newly raised Irish Guards in 1900. On 30 May 1902 he was appointed a Commander of the Royal Victorian Order, following the presentation of Colours to the regiment. From 1906 to 1908 he commanded the 15th Infantry Brigade at Belfast, and from March 1908 to 1912 he commanded the 2nd London Division of the Territorial Force, in which post he was succeeded by Charles Monro. He retired from the army in 1914. He was promoted to major general on 31 March 1908. Hw retired from the army on 22 April 1914.

He was, however, recalled for service as an inspector of infantry on 28 September 1914, during the early stages of World War I.

== Notes ==
Military offices
New title	GOC 2nd London Division; 1908–1912	Succeeded by Charles Monro
