= Warner Westenra, 2nd Baron Rossmore =

Irish Baron

The Right Honourable The Lord Rossmore

Member of the Dublin Parliament for County Monaghan
- In office August 1800 – December 1800 Serving with Richard Dawson
- Preceded by: Charles Powell Leslie I; Richard Dawson
- Succeeded by: Parliament of the United Kingdom

Member of Parliament for County Monaghan
- In office 1801–1801 Serving with Richard Dawson
- Preceded by: New constituency
- Succeeded by: Richard Dawson; Charles Powell Leslie II

Member of the House of Lords
- Lord Temporal
- In office 23 June 1838 – 10 August 1842
- Preceded by: Peerage created
- Succeeded by: The 3rd Baron Rossmore

Personal details
- Born: Warner William Westenra; 14 October 1765
- Died: 10 August 1842 (aged 76); Rossmore Park, County Monaghan, Ireland
- Children: Henry Westenra, 3rd Baron Rossmore

Warner William Westenra, 2nd Baron Rossmore (14 October 1765 – 10 August 1842), was an Anglo-Irish landowner and politician.

== Background and education ==
Westenra was the son of Henry Westenra, Member of Parliament for County Monaghan, by Harriet Murray, daughter of Colonel John Murray, also Member of Parliament for County Monaghan. He was educated at Trinity College Dublin.

== Public life ==
Westenra was returned to the Irish House of Commons for County Monaghan in August 1800, a seat he held until December of that year, when the Irish Parliament was abolished. He then represented the newly created constituency County Monaghan in the British Parliament until 1801, when he succeeded his maternal aunt's husband General Robert Cuninghame, 1st Baron Rossmore, as 2nd Baron Rossmore according to a special remainder in the letters patent. This was an Irish peerage and did not entitle him to an automatic seat in the House of Lords, although he was forced to resign from his seat in the House of Commons as Irish peers were not allowed to represent Irish constituencies in Parliament. In 1805 he became Custos Rotulorum of County Monaghan, and in 1831 he became the first Lord-Lieutenant of County Monaghan. He held both posts until his death. In 1838 he was created Baron Rossmore, of the County of Monaghan, in the Peerage of the United Kingdom, which gave him a seat in the House of Lords.

== Family ==
Lord Rossmore married firstly Mary Ann Walsh, daughter of Charles Walsh, of Walsh Park, County Tipperary and Sarah Simpson, in 1791, and had three sons:

- Henry Robert Westenra (24 August 1792 – 1 December 1860), later 3rd Baron Rossmore
- Hon. Richard Westenra (21 February 1796 – 9 June 1838), married Henrietta, daughter of Henry Owen Scott, on 8 June 1822. They had three known daughters.
- Lt.-Col. Hon. John Craven Westenra (31 March 1798 – 5 December 1874)

Their third son, John, represented King's County in Parliament. Lady Rossmore died in August 1807 and Lord Rossmore married secondly Lady Augusta Charteris, daughter of Francis Charteris, Lord Elcho, in 1819. There were no children from this marriage. She died in July 1840. Lord Rossmore died at Rossmore Park, County Monaghan, in August 1842, aged 76, and was succeeded in his titles by his eldest son, Henry.

Parliament of Ireland
Preceded by Charles Powell Leslie I Richard Dawson	Member of Parliament for County Monaghan; August–December 1800; With: Richard Dawson	Succeeded by Parliament of the United Kingdom
Parliament of the United Kingdom
New constituency	Member of Parliament for County Monaghan; 1801; With: Richard Dawson	Succeeded by Richard Dawson; Charles Powell Leslie II
Honorary titles
New office	Lord-Lieutenant of County Monaghan; 1831–1836	Succeeded by Hon. Henry Westenra
Peerage of Ireland
Preceded by Robert Cuninghame	Baron Rossmore; 1st creation 1824–1842	Succeeded by Henry Westenra
Peerage of the United Kingdom
New creation	Baron Rossmore; 2nd creation 1838–1842; Member of the House of Lords (1838–1842)	Succeeded by Henry Westenra
