= Charles C. Leslie =

American mariner and entrepreneur

- Born: Charles C. Leslie; April 12, 1841; Chandler, South Carolina, U.S.
- Died: April 14, 1911 (aged 70); Charleston
- Resting place: Unity and Friendship Society Cemetery
- Occupations: Fish purveyor, mariner, and businessman.

Charles C. Leslie (April 12, 1841 – April 14, 1911) was free African American fisherman, mariner, and businessman in South Carolina.

== Early life ==
Charles C Leslie was born on April 12, 1841, in Chandler, South Carolina. Leslie received an education at home, including a knowledge of writing and mathematics. His family was Episcopalian.

While still a teenager, Leslie studied the obstacles along the South Carolina coastline and within Charleston Harbor. The well-financed northern fishermen who dominated the supply at seafood market at Charleston avoided the coastline. Meanwhile, Leslie learned that there was little competition in harvesting seafood close to land.

== Career ==
Leslie transported arms to the Confederate States of America during the American Civil War.

By the end of the American Civil War, Leslie gained a partner, A. Francis Lopez, with whom he had acquired a fleet of small vessels. They also set up nets on rivers near Charleston, South Carolina, being part of a fishing industry so successful that the South Carolina Legislature regulated catches as an environmental measure. Meanwhile, Leslie and Lopez defended themselves against theft of their harvesting. By the late 1860s, they hired many local fishermen and bought the harvests of independent fishermen. In addition to knowing the local coastal water, they also built competence in keeping fish fresh while storing them and transporting them to the Charleston Market.

== Public organizations ==
Leslie was an officer for the Charleston Chapter of the Prince Hall Masons after it formed in 1867. He was an organizer of the Unity and Friendship Society. Along with other Charleston African Americans, he was a co-founder of St. Mark's Episcopal church. He also promoted Richard H. Gleaves as a candidate for South Carolina Lieutenant Governor. He also was part of local advocacy to legalize phosphate mining on the Coosaw River.

== Bibliography ==
- Cecelski, David S. (2000). The Waterman's Song: Slavery and Freedom in Maritime North Carolina. Chapel Hill, NC: University of North Carolina Press. ISBN 978-0807849729.
- Powers, Bernard E., Jr. (1994). Black Charlestonians: A Social History 1822−1885. Fayetteville, AR: University of Arkansas Press. ISBN 978-1557283641.
- Shields, David S. (2015). Southern Provisions: The Creation and Revival of a Cuisine. Chicago: University of Chicago Press. ISBN 9780226141114.
