= Lord Lieutenant of Monaghan =

Ceremonial officer in Monaghan, Ireland

This is a list of people who have served as Lord Lieutenant of County Monaghan.

There were lieutenants of counties in Ireland until the reign of James II, when they were renamed governors. The office of Lord Lieutenant was recreated on 23 August 1831.

== Governors ==
- Edward Blayney, 1st Baron Blayney 1604– (died 1629)
- Cadwallader Blayney, 7th Baron Blayney c.1713–
- Charles Talbot Blayney, 8th Baron Blayney c.1735–
- William Fortescue, 1st Earl of Clermont: 1775–1806
- Warner Westenra, 2nd Baron Rossmore: –1831
- Charles Powell Leslie: 1802–1831

== Lord Lieutenants ==
- Warner Westenra, 2nd Baron Rossmore: 7 October 1831 – 1836
- Henry Westenra, 3rd Baron Rossmore: 13 June 1836 – 6 December 1858
- Charles Leslie: 1858 – 26 June 1871
- Richard Dawson, 1st Earl of Dartrey: 18 October 1871 – 12 May 1897
- Derrick Westenra, 5th Baron Rossmore: 18 June 1897 – 31 January 1921
- Sir John Leslie, 2nd Baronet: 18 March 1921 – 1922
