= Evelyn Shirley (1788–1856) =

British politician

Evelyn John Shirley (26 April 1788 – 31 December 1856), was a British politician.

== Background ==
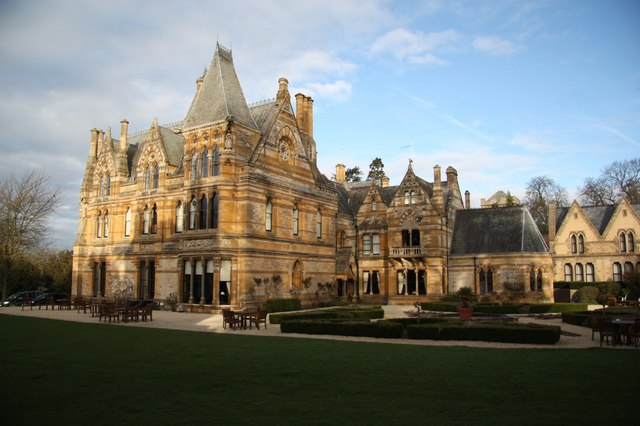
Ettington Park

Shirley was the eldest son of Evelyn Shirley, son of the Hon. George Shirley, younger son of Robert Shirley, 1st Earl Ferrers. His mother was Phillis Byam Wollaston, daughter of Charlton Wollaston. He was educated at Rugby School later Matriculating to St John's College, Cambridge in 1807.

He inherited Ettington Park, making some alterations to it in 1824.

== Political career ==
After having served as High Sheriff of Warwickshire for 1813–14 and High Sheriff of Monaghan for 1824–25, Shirley was returned to Parliament for County Monaghan in 1826, a seat he held until 1831. He later represented Warwickshire South between 1836 and 1849.

== Family ==
Shirley married Eliza, daughter of Arthur Stanhope, in 1810. They had several children, including Evelyn Shirley, also a politician, and Arthur Shirley (1813–1877), a Major-General in the Army. Shirley died in December 1856, aged 68. His wife survived him by three years and died in April 1859.

== See also ==
- Earl Ferrers

== Notes ==
Parliament of the United Kingdom
Preceded by Charles Powell Leslie II; Hon. Henry Westenra	Member of Parliament for County Monaghan; 1826–1831; With: Hon. Henry Westenra 1826–1830; Hon. Cadwallader Blayney 1830–1831	Succeeded by Hon. Cadwallader Blayney; Hon. Henry Westenra
Preceded by Sir John Mordaunt, Bt; Edward Ralph Charles Sheldon	Member of Parliament for Warwickshire South; 1836–1849; With: Sir John Mordaunt, Bt 1836–1845; Lord Brooke 1845–1849	Succeeded by Lord Brooke; Lord Guernsey
