= Sir John Leslie, 1st Baronet =

British Conservative politician, landowner and painter

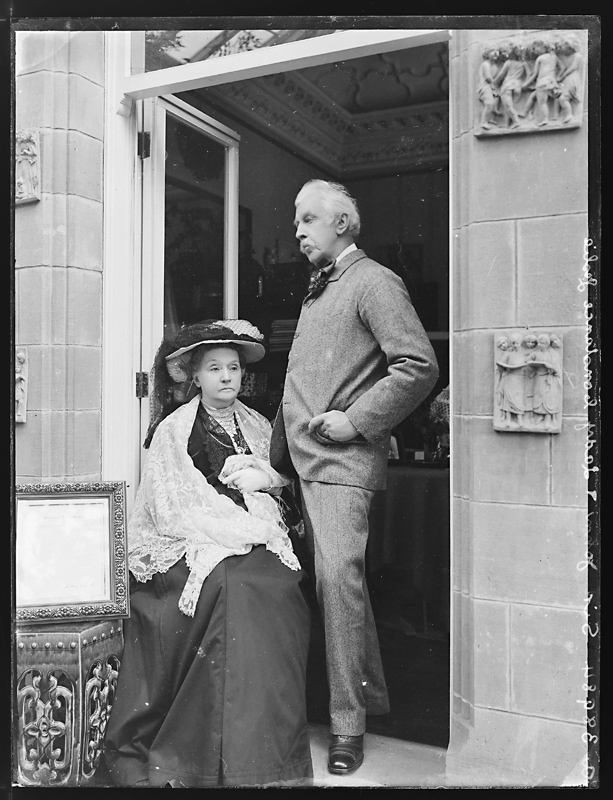
Sir John Leslie, Bt and his wife at Glaslough, County Monaghan

Sir John Leslie, 1st Baronet, JP, DL (16 December 1822 – 23 January 1916) was a British Conservative politician, landowner and painter. He was Member of Parliament for County Monaghan between 1871 and 1880. He succeeded his elder brother, Charles Powell Leslie, in that role.

== Biography ==
He was the second son of Charles Powell Leslie and his second wife, the former Christiana Fosbery (died 1869). Among his siblings was Christiana, the Marchioness of Waterford. He was educated at Harrow and Christ Church, Oxford. He obtained a commission as a Captain in the 1st Life Guards. However, after embarking on a Grand Tour in 1847 he resigned his Army commission and pursued artistic interests.

He was a Justice of the peace and Deputy lieutenant for counties Monaghan and Donegal. In 1876, at the recommendation of Disraeli, he was made 1st Baronet Leslie, of Glaslough. He built Glaslough House as a replacement for Castle Leslie.

In 1854, he met at Hazelwood a distinguished Waterloo veteran, Colonel George Dawson-Damer (younger brother of the 2nd Earl of Portarlington), and his daughter, Lady Constance, whom Leslie married two years later at St George's, Hanover Square, London.

He owned acres 44,000 acres, with 14,000 in Monaghan, 29,000 in Donegal and 1000 in Tyrone.

== Family ==
Sir John Leslie married Lady Constance Dawson-Damer, daughter of George Dawson-Damer and sister of the 4th Earl of Portarlington. had one son and four daughters:

- Sir John Leslie, 2nd Baronet (1857–1944)
- Mary Leslie (1858–1936)
- Constance Christina Leslie (1861–1945)
- Theodosia Leslie (1865–1940)
- Olive Louisa Blanche Leslie (1872–1945)

Parliament of the United Kingdom
Preceded by Charles Powell Leslie III; Sewallis Evelyn Shirley	Member of Parliament for County Monaghan; 1871–1880; With: Sewallis Evelyn Shirley)	Succeeded by John Givan; William Findlater
Baronetage of the United Kingdom
New creation	Baronet (of Glaslough); 1876–1916	Succeeded by Sir John Leslie
