= John Montgomery (1747–1797) =

Colonel John Montgomery (7 September 1747-April 1797) was an Irish soldier and M.P.

His father was General Alexander Montgomery (died 1785) of Ballyleck, County Monaghan. His mother was Catharine Willoughby, daughter of Colonel Hugh Willoughby of Carrow, County Fermanagh. On his father's he inherited the Ballyleck estate.

He was appointed Colonel-in-Chief of the Monaghan Militia when it was formed in 1793. He was appointed High Sheriff of Monaghan for 1777. He was elected the MP for County Monaghan, Ireland from October 1783 until his death in April 1797.

On his death in Dublin his body was brought back to Monaghan for burial in Kilmore churchyard. He had married Miss Salisbury Wilhelmina Tipping, eldest daughter of Thomas Tipping, esquire of Beaulieu, County Louth but died without issue.
