= Sir George Forster, 2nd Baronet =

Irish politician

Sir George Forster, 2nd Baronet (21 March 1796 – 4 April 1876), was an Irish politician.

He was born at Baronstown Glebe, co. Louth, the only son and heir of Sir Thomas Forster, 1st Baronet of Coolderry, co. Monaghan and educated at Trinity College Dublin, graduating B.A. in 1817 and M.A. in 1833. He succeeded to the baronetcy on the death of his father in 1843.

In 1817 Forster was appointed High Sheriff of Monaghan and then elected to the United Kingdom House of Commons as Member of Parliament for County Monaghan in 1852, holding the seat until 1865.

He married twice: firstly in 1817, Anna Maria, daughter of Matthew Fortescue and secondly, in 1855, his cousin, Charlotte Jane, daughter of William Hoare Hume.

He died in Dublin aged 80 and was buried at Ballinode. He was succeeded by his eldest son, who became Sir Thomas Oriel Forster, 3rd Baronet.

Parliament of the United Kingdom
Preceded by Thomas Vesey Dawson; Charles Powell Leslie III	Member of Parliament for County Monaghan; 1852 – 1865; With: Charles Powell Leslie III	Succeeded by Vesey Dawson; Charles Powell Leslie III
Baronetage of Ireland
Preceded by Thomas Forster	Baronet (of Coolderry); 1843–1876	Succeeded by Thomas Oriel Forster
