= County Monaghan (Parliament of Ireland constituency) =

Pre-1801 Irish constituency

- Former county constituency for the Irish House of Commons
- County: County Monaghan

–1801
- Seats: 2
- Replaced by: County Monaghan

County Monaghan was a constituency represented in the Irish House of Commons until 1800.

== Members of Parliament ==
- 1613 Sir Edward Blaney and Sir Bryan McMahon
- 1634–1635 Artoge McMahon (died and replaced 1634 by Richard Blayney, 4th Baron Blayney) and Collo McBrien McMahon (replaced 1634 by Nicholas Simpson)
- 1656 Protectorate Parliament: Richard Blayney, 4th Baron Blayney
- 1660 Richard Blayney, 4th Baron Blayney & Oliver Ancketil
- 1661–1666 Richard Blayney, 4th Baron Blayney and John Foster

=== 1692–1801 ===
Election	First MP	Second MP
1692	Dacres Barrett	William Barton
August 1695	Francis Lucas	William Barton
1695	Henry Tenison	William Barton
1703	Robert Echlin	William Barton
1713	Sir Alexander Cairnes, 1st Bt	Alexander Montgomery
1723	Sir Alexander Cairnes, 1st Bt	Thomas Coote
1727	Sir Alexander Cairnes, 1st Bt	John Montgomery
1728	Hugh Willoughby	John Montgomery
1733	Hugh Willoughby	Thomas Coote
1741	Hugh Willoughby	John Montgomery
October 1741	Hugh Willoughby	John Murray
1743	Hugh Willoughby	Alexander Montgomery
1749	Thomas Dawson	Alexander Montgomery
1761	Thomas Dawson	Edward Lucas
1768	Alexander Montgomery	Edward Lucas
1775	Alexander Montgomery	Thomas Tenison
1783	Charles Powell Leslie I	John Montgomery
1797	Charles Powell Leslie I	Richard Dawson
1800	Warner William Westenra	Richard Dawson
1801	Succeeded by Westminster constituency County Monaghan	
