= Charles Miller Leslie =

American medical anthropologist

- Born: 1923; Arkansas
- Died: August 15, 2009
- Education: Ba. A M.A., University of Chicago; Ph.D., University of Chicago
- Occupation: Anthropologist
- Spouse: Zelda (1946- until death)
- Children: Mario, Sam, Mira

Charles Miller Leslie (1923–2009) was an American medical anthropologist, who was an avid contributor of published works in his branch of anthropology. Leslie's career was influential to the shaping of medical anthropology, as his works have inspired other medical anthropologists to further research and popularize anthropological concepts which includes medical pluralism, social relations of therapy management, the relationship between state and medical systems, and health discourse. Leslie's main focus within medical anthropology has been the study of Asian medical systems, specifically Ayurvedic, Unani, and Chinese medicine.

== Life and education ==
Leslie served in the American Army Air Corps as a pilot during the Second World War.

Following his service in the army, Leslie pursued a degree in the Bachelor of Arts, Master's degree, and finally earning a doctorate degree from the University of Chicago. While in Chicago, Leslie met his future wife, Zelda, and wed in 1946. The marriage produced two sons, and a daughter.

== Focal point as an anthropologist ==
With a career spanning over forty years, Leslie had the opportunity to research many fields within anthropology, but found his calling in the sub-field of medical anthropology.

Within medical anthropology, Leslie focused most of his time and resources on studying the concept of medical pluralism, and Asian medical systems. Because of Leslie's deep interest in Asian medical systems, it allowed for him to travel to many Oceanic and Asian countries, which is where most of his research on medical pluralism takes place.

“The structural reasons that medical pluralism is a prominent feature of medical care throughout the world are that biomedicine, like Ayurveda and every other therapeutics, fails to help many patients. Every system generates discontent with its limitations and a search for alternative therapies...Ayurveda, biomedicine, and other traditions of medicine provide different rhetorics or responsibility and different meanings of suffering”. -Leslie on medical pluralism from his book Paths to Asian Medical Knowledge

One of Leslie's most famous works was his book Asian Medical Systems (1976). In Asian Medical Systems, Leslie draws attention to modernizing movements and their effects on lost medical traditions.

In the introduction of Asian Medical Systems, Leslie describes Asian medical systems as “formulated from generic physiological and cosmological concepts”, and “...great medical traditions were relatively independent, they evolved in similar ways. They all became professional branches of scientific learning in the millennium between the fifth century B.C. and the fifth century A.D.”.

Arguably, what can be considered Leslie's greatest accomplishment as an anthropologist, is his work. Which has been credited as the inspiration for work done by other anthropologists in the field, this can be seen no clearer than in the 2002 festschrift, New Horizons in Medical Anthropology: Essays in Honour of Charles Leslie, written in his honour by peers and former students who have been influenced by his work. This ripple-effect that his work has started can be best seen when comparing current work traditional and alternative medical systems and Leslie's.

== Career in academia ==
Leslie has worked as a professor for many international post-secondary institutions throughout his career.

Permanent positions:

- Pomona College (1956–66)
- Case Western Reserve (1966–67)
- New York University (1967–76)
- University of Delaware, where he achieved the position of Emeritus Professor (1976–91)

Visiting positions:

- University of Washington (Seattle)
- University of California, Berkeley
- Harvard University
- McGill University
- University of London- School of Oriental and Asian Studies

== Peer-nominated career achievements ==
- Distinguished Service Award from the American Anthropological Association
- Career achievement Award from the Society for Medical Anthropology
- New Horizons in Medical Anthropology: Essays in Honour of Charles Leslie (2002), a festschrift by former co-workers and students.

== Publications by Leslie ==
Books

- Now We Are Civilized: A study of the world view of the Zapotec Indians of Mitla, Oaxaca (1960)
- Anthropology of Folk Religion (1960)
- Uomo a mito nelle culture primitive (1965)
- Asian Medical Systems: A comparative study (1976)
- Reprint of Now We Are Civilized (1980)
- Paths to Asian Medical Knowledge (1992)
- Indian edition of Paths to Asian Medical Knowledge (1993)
- Indian edition of Asian Medical Systems: A comparative study (1998)

Articles

- “The Rhetoric of the Ayurvedic Revival in Modern India”, MAN (1963)
- “Professional, and Popular Health Cultures in South Asia”, Understanding Science and Technology in India and Pakistan (1967)
- “The Professionalization of Ayurvedic and Unani Medicine”, Transactions of the New York Academy of Sciences (1968)
- “Asian Medicine”, Medical Anthropology Newsletter (1972)
- “Asian Medical Systems: A Symposium on the Role of Comparative Sociology in Improving Health Care”, Social Science & Medicine (1973)
- “Scientific Medicine in a Secular Society”, Religion and Medicine (1974)
- “Medical pluralism in world perspective”, Medical Pluralism (1980)
- “Medicine in Asia”, Encyclopedia of Asian History (1987)
- “Social research and health care planning in South Asia”, Bulletin of the History of Medicine (1988)
- “Magic and Curing in Thailand”, Reviews in Anthropology (1989)
- “India’s Community Health Workers Scheme: A Sociological Analysis”, Ancient Science of Life (1989)

As an Editor

- Asian Medical Studies: A Comparative Study (1976)
- Medical Pluralism (1980)
- Editor for Social Science & Medicine

== Bibliography ==
- Leslie, Charles, 1992 Paths to Asian medical knowledge. Interpretations of Illness: Syncretism in Modern Ayurveda. Berkeley: University of California Press. pp. 177–208.
- Lock, Margaret and Mark Nichter, 2002, New Horizons in Medical Anthropology: Essays in Honour of Charles Leslie. pp. 297–300.
- Madan, T.N., 2010, Charles Miller Leslie, 1923–2009. Contributions to Indian Sociology. Retrieved 23 January 2012 from < http://cis.sagepub.com/content/44/3/395.full.pdf>
- Nathan Butler Funeral Home, 2009, Charles Miller Leslie. Retrieved 23 January 2012 from, <http://www.forevercare.org/Obituaries/2009_Aug-Oct/Charles_Leslie.htm>
- Nichter, Mark and Sjaak van der Geest, 2010, Obituary Charles Leslie (1923–2009). Medische Antropologie, Vol. 2. pp. 305–306. Retrieved 23 January 2012 from, < http://www.sjaakvandergeest.socsci.uva.nl/pdf/varia/Charles_Leslie_ob.pdf>
- University of Delaware, 2009, In Memoriam: Charles Leslie. Accessed on 23 January 2012 from, <http://www.udel.edu/udaily/2010/aug/leslie082809.html>
