= Richard Dawson, 1st Earl of Dartrey =

Irish noble

Richard Dawson, 1st Earl of Dartrey KP (7 September 1817 – 12 May 1897), styled the Hon. Richard Dawson until 1827 and the Lord Cremorne from 1827 to 1866, was an Anglo-Irish Liberal, and later Liberal Unionist, politician.

== Life ==
Lord Dartrey was the second and only surviving son of the 2nd Baron Cremorne and his wife, Anne Elizabeth Emily (née Whaley), and succeeded his father in the barony in 1827 at the age of nine. As this was an Irish peerage, it did not entitle him to a hereditary seat in the House of Lords.

In the late 1830s, The Most Rev. William Crolly, Catholic Archbishop of Armagh, was seeking a site for a new Catholic cathedral. The main difficulty in constructing a Catholic cathedral at Armagh was that the land of Armagh City and suburbs consisted almost entirely of "see-land", the mensal estate or demesne of the Protestant Primate and thus would not be available for the Catholic episcopacy to purchase. A site at the apex of a hill on the outskirts of the town had however been sold to Lord Cremorne. Terms were negotiated and around 1840 construction began on St Patrick's Cathedral.

In 1847 he was created Baron Dartrey, of Dartrey in County Monaghan, in the Peerage of the United Kingdom, which allowed him to take a seat in the House of Lords.

Dartrey served as a Lord-in-waiting (government whip in the House of Lords) under Lord Palmerston from 1857 to 1858 and under Palmerston and later Lord Russell from 1859 to 1866. He was made a Knight of the Order of St Patrick in 1855 and in 1866 he was further honoured when he was made Earl of Dartrey, of Dartrey in the County of Monaghan.

In 1886 Dartrey broke with William Ewart Gladstone over Irish Home Rule and moved to the Liberal Unionist benches in the House of Lords. He also served as Lord-Lieutenant of County Monaghan from 1871 to 1897.

He owned 30,000 acres.

== Marriage and issue ==
Lord Dartrey married Augusta, daughter of Edward Stanley, in 1841. Their daughter, Lady Mary Eleanor Anne, married the 5th Earl of Ilchester. Their second son, the Hon. Edward Stanley Dawson, became a captain in the Royal Navy. The Countess of Dartrey died in August 1887, aged 64. Lord Dartrey survived her by ten years and died in May 1897, aged 79. He was succeeded in his titles by his eldest son, Vesey.

Honorary titles
| Preceded by Charles Powell Leslie III | Lord Lieutenant of Monaghan; 1871–1897 | Succeeded by The Lord Rossmore |
Peerage of the United Kingdom
| New creation | Earl of Dartrey; 1866–1897 | Succeeded by Vesey Dawson |
| New creation | Baron Dartrey; 1847–1897 | Succeeded by Vesey Dawson |
Peerage of Ireland
| Preceded by Richard Thomas Dawson | Baron Cremorne; 1827–1897 | Succeeded by Vesey Dawson |
