= Evelyn Shirley (1812–1882) =

British politician, antiquary and genealogist

Evelyn Philip Shirley (22 January 1812 – 19 September 1882), was a British politician, antiquary and genealogist.

== Background ==
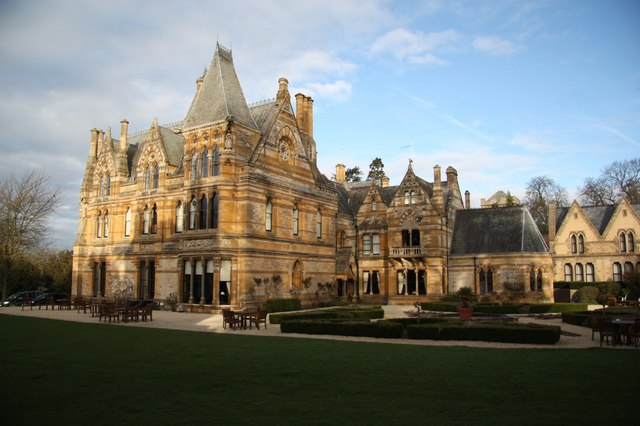
Ettington Park

Shirley was born in London, the eldest son of Evelyn Shirley and Eliza, daughter of Arthur Stanhope. He was a descendant of Robert Shirley, 1st Earl Ferrers. He was educated first privately and from 1826 at Eton College, before matriculating in 1830 from Magdalen College, Oxford, graduating BA in 1834 and MA in 1837.

He inherited Ettington Park at Alderminster, near Stratford-on-Avon on the death of his father in 1856 and commissioned architect John Prichard to remodel it in 1858. It is now a Grade I listed building.

== Career ==
Shirley sat as Member of Parliament for County Monaghan from 1841 to 1847 and for South Warwickshire from 1853 to 1865. He served as High Sheriff of Monaghan for 1837 and as High Sheriff of Warwickshire for 1867.

== Personal ==
Shirley married Mary Clara Elizabeth, daughter of Sir Edmund Lechmere, 2nd Baronet, in 1842. They had one son, Sewallis Shirley, and three daughters. Shirley died in September 1882, aged 70. His wife died in August 1894.

== See also ==
- Earl Ferrers

Parliament of the United Kingdom
Preceded by Edward Lucas; Hon. Henry Westenra	Member of Parliament for County Monaghan; 1841–1847; With: Hon. Henry Westenra 1841–1843; Charles Powell Leslie III 1843–1847	Succeeded by Charles Powell Leslie III; Thomas Vesey Dawson
Preceded by Lord Brooke; Lord Guernsey	Member of Parliament for Warwickshire South; 1853–1865; With: Lord Guernsey 1853–1857; Edward Bolton King 1857–1859; Sir Charles Mordaunt, Bt 1859–1865	Succeeded by Sir Charles Mordaunt, Bt; Henry Christopher Wyse
