= Charles Powell Leslie (1821–1871) =

British politician (1821–1871)

- Born: September 13, 1821
- Died: June 26, 1871 (aged 49)
- Education: Christ Church, Oxford
- Occupations: politician, landowner
- Known for: Member of Parliament for County Monaghan (1843–1871)

Charles Powell Leslie (13 September 1821 – 26 June 1871) was a British Conservative politician and landowner. He was member of parliament for County Monaghan between 1843 and 1871, and Lord Lieutenant of Monaghan between 1858 and 1871. He was the third of his name; his father, and grandfather, also represented Monaghan.

Leslie was educated at Christ Church, Oxford, where he matriculated in 1839. He played one first class cricket match for Oxford University Cricket Club against Marylebone Cricket Club at Lord's on 16–17 March 1841.

He was squire of Castle Leslie, Glaslough, County Monaghan. He was unmarried, died without issue, and was succeeded as MP by his younger brother Sir John Leslie, 1st Baronet.

Parliament of the United Kingdom
Preceded by Henry Westenra	Member of Parliament for County Monaghan; 1843–1871; With: Evelyn_Shirley to 1847; Thomas Vesey Dawson 1847–1852; Sir George Forster 1852–1865; Vesey Dawson 1865–1868; Sewallis Shirley from 1868	Succeeded by John Leslie
Government offices
Preceded by The Baron Rossmore	Lord Lieutenant of Monaghan; 1858–1871	Succeeded by The Earl of Dartrey
