= Thomas Montgomery (Irish politician) =

Irish politician

Thomas Montgomery (1700 – April 1761) was an Irish politician. Unlike his father and his sons Montgomery never appeared to have served in the British Army.

== Early years ==
He was born in 1700 to Colonel Alexander Montgomery M.P. for County Monaghan, of Ballyleck, County Monaghan, and Elizabeth Cole, (married 1696), daughter of Colonel Thomas Cole of Mount Florence, Florencecourt, County Fermanagh.

== Political career ==
He was elected Member of Parliament (MP) for Lifford, County Donegal in 1729 until his death in April 1761, at the age of 61.

== Personal ==
He married an Englishwoman, Mary Franklin (died April 1758), against his father's wishes and was disinherited by his father.

Their children were:

- American Revolutionary War hero and former British Army officer Major General Richard Montgomery
- Colonel Alexander Montgomery, M.P. for County Donegal in 1768 and British Army officer
- John Montgomery (1728–1787), a merchant in Lisbon, Portugal
- Sarah Montgomery, who became Lady Ranelagh after marrying Charles Wilkinson Jones, the 4th Viscount Ranelagh.

Up to 1729 his first cousin Colonel Alexander Montgomery shared the parliamentary patronage of Lifford, County Donegal with the Creighton family, the Earls of Erne. There is an agreement in the Erne papers (held in the Northern Ireland Public Records Office) dated 1727 between Alexander Montgomery and General David Creighton about the sharing of Lifford Corporation and its representation in the Irish House of Commons, to which it sent two MPs. One of the articles of agreement was that, if Montgomery should die without a son, then his interest should pass to the Creightons. Montgomery was elected as an MP for Donegal County in the General Election held later on in 1727, so General David Creighton and his son and heir, Abraham Creighton, (later the 1st Lord Erne) were returned as the two Lifford MPs. General David Creighton died in 1728 so the Lifford seat was filled by Thomas Montgomery, the nephew of Alexander. On the death of Thomas Montgomery in 1761, full control of the Lifford seats passed to Abraham Creighton.

Thomas is recorded as leasing land at Abbeville, Dublin from 1736.
