= Douglas Dawson =

British Army World War I general

Brigadier-General Sir Douglas Dawson GCVO KCB CMG
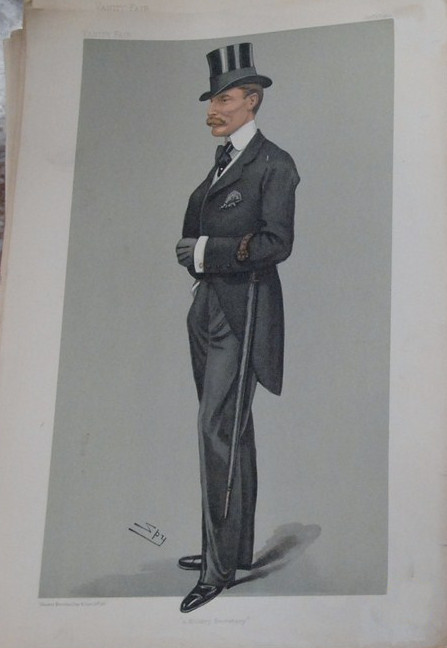
- "A Military Secretary", caricature by Spy, Vanity Fair, 1903
- Born: 12 April 1854
- Died: 20 January 1933 (aged 78)
- Relatives: Richard Thomas Dawson, 2nd Baron Cremorne (grandfather); Major General Vesey John Dawson (brother)
- Military career
- Allegiance: United Kingdom
- Branch: British Army
- Service years: 1874–1919
- Rank: Brigadier-General
- Commands: 10th Provisional Battalion
- Conflicts: Anglo-Egyptian War; Mahdist War; First World War
- Awards: Knight Grand Cross of the Royal Victorian Order; Knight Commander of the Order of the Bath; Companion of the Order of St Michael and St George; Mentioned in Despatches

Brigadier-General Sir Douglas Frederick Rawdon Dawson, GCVO, KCB, CMG (25 April 1854 – 20 January 1933) was a British Army officer and courtier.

== Background and education ==
Dawson was the second son of the Hon. Thomas Vesey Dawson, an officer of the Coldstream Guards who was killed at the Battle of Inkerman. His paternal grandfather was Richard Thomas Dawson, 2nd Baron Cremorne. His elder brother, Vesey, was also a British Army officer. He attended Eton College, and then joined the Coldstream Guards as a lieutenant on 21 January 1874, attending the Staff College in 1881.

== Military and diplomatic career ==
Dawson saw service with the Anglo-Egyptian War, where he fought at the battles of Mahuta, Kassassin, Tel el-Kebir and the capture of Cairo. In the Nile Expedition of 1884–85, he was part of the Guards' Camel Corps, was mentioned in despatches, and saw action at the Battle of Abu Klea. He was promoted to captain on 19 September 1885, was on 1 April 1890 seconded for service with his regiment to serve as a military attaché in Vienna, major on 29 July 1891, and lieutenant-colonel on 19 May 1897. From 1895 to 1901 he was Military Attaché, posted to Austria-Hungary, Serbia, France, Belgium and Switzerland. He received a brevet promotion to colonel on 19 May 1901, and the following year returned to the United Kingdom where he was in command of the 10th Provisional Battalion stationed at Dover from March to December 1902. The following year he was appointed Master of the Ceremonies to King Edward VII, serving from 1903 to 1907 and then as a Comptroller in the Lord Chamberlain's Department.

On the outbreak of the First World War Dawson received an appointment as Assistant Director of Personal Services at the War Office from 1914 to 1915, and was appointed Inspector of Vulnerable Points at GHQ from 1916 to 1919, in which role he was again mentioned in despatches.

After the war, on 3 June 1919, he was promoted to the honorary rank of brigadier general. In 1920 he resigned his position as comptroller and was appointed State Chamberlain, holding the office until 1924.

== Awards and honours ==
As a result of his diplomatic career and his position at the Court, Dawson held a number of British and foreign decorations, including the Iron Crown of Austria (Knight Commander); the Turkish Order of Medjidie (3rd class); the Danish Order of Dannebrog (Grand Cross); the Japanese Grand Cross of the Order of the Sacred Treasure and Grand Cross of the Order of the Rising Sun; the Grand Cross of the Crown of Italy; and the Grand Cross of the Crown of Romania. He served as the Registrar and Secretary to the Order of the Bath, and the Secretary to the Order of the Garter.

== Personal life ==
Dawson married Aimée Evelyn Pirie, formerly Mrs Oakley, in 1903. She was appointed a Dame Grand Cross of the Order of the British Empire in 1918.

Sir Douglas and Dame Aimée Dawson lived at Medmenham Abbey in Buckinghamshire. Their adopted daughter, Rosemary Dawson, married Lieutenant-Colonel Vernon Erskine-Crum; the couple had one son, Brigadier Douglas Erskine Crum.
