= Charles Powell Leslie (1769–1831) =

Irish politician (1769-1831)

Colonel Charles Powell Leslie, JP (1769 – 15 November 1831), of Castle Leslie, Glaslough, County Monaghan, was an Irish landowner and politician.

He was the eldest son of Charles Powell Leslie and the Hon. Prudence Penelope Hill-Trevor, daughter of Arthur Hill-Trevor, 1st Viscount Dungannon, and therefore, a cousin of the Duke of Wellington. His brothers were the Rt. Rev. John Leslie and Rev. Edward Leslie. He was educated at Christ Church, Oxford.

Leslie, whose father had represented County Monaghan (1783–1800) in the Irish House of Commons prior to union, was Member of Parliament for County Monaghan (1801–1826) and New Ross (1830–1831). He was Colonel of the County Monaghan militia. He served as High Sheriff of Monaghan in 1788 and Governor until 1831. He was also trustee of the linen board.

He was married to Anne (née Ryder), daughter of Rev. Dudley Ryder, from 1791 to her death in 1813, with whom he had three daughters. He married secondly Christiana (née Fosbery), daughter of George Fosbery, of Clorhane, Limerick. By his second wife he had three sons and four daughters, including Charles Powell Leslie, Sir John Leslie, 1st Baronet, Christiana Beresford, Marchioness of Waterford, and Prudentia Penelope Cavendish-Bentinck.

== Ancestors ==
Ancestors of Charles Powell Leslie (1769–1831)

16. John Leslie, Bishop of Clogher
8. Rev. Charles Leslie
17. Katherine Conyngham
4. Robert Leslie
18. Very Rev. Richard Griffith, Dean of Ross
9. Jane Griffith
2. Charles Powell Leslie (I)
20. Sir John Rogerson
10. John Rogerson
21. Elizabeth Proby
5. Frances Rogerson
22. Stephen Ludlow MP
11. Elizabeth Ludlow
1. Charles Powell Leslie (II)
24. William Hill of Hillsborough
12. Michael Hill MP
25. Eleanor Boyle
6. Arthur Hill-Trevor, 1st Viscount Dungannon
26. Sir John Trevor
13. Anne Trevor
27. Jane Mostyn
3. Hon. Prudence Penelope Hill-Trevor
28. Edmund Stafford
14. Edmund Francis Stafford
29. Anne Stafford
7. Anne Stafford
30. Henry Leslie
15. Penelope Leslie
31. Margaret Beaghan

Parliament of the United Kingdom
| Preceded by Warner Westenra | Member of Parliament for County Monaghan; 1801–1826; With: Richard Dawson to 1807; Thomas Corry 1807–1812; Richard Dawson 1812–1813; Thomas Corry 1813–1818; Henry Westenra from 1818 | Succeeded by John Leslie |
Government offices
| Preceded by Warner Westenra | Governor of Monaghan; 1802–1831 | Succeeded by Warner Westenra (as Lord Lieutenant) |
