= Richard Dawson (Irish politician, born 1762) =

Irish politician

Richard Dawson (16 April 1762 – 3 September 1807) was an Irish Member of Parliament.

== Biography ==
He was the third son of Richard Dawson of Ardee by his wife Anne, daughter of Sir Edward O'Brien, 2nd Baronet, and after his father's death in 1782 he became heir-presumptive to his uncle Thomas Dawson, 1st Baron Dartrey. On 22 May 1784 he married Catherine, daughter of Colonel Arthur Graham of Hockley, county Armagh; they had one son and four daughters. Dawson was elected to the Irish House of Commons for County Monaghan in April 1797 through the influence of his uncle (now Viscount Cremorne), and was named as heir in the special remainder of the barony of Cremorne granted to his uncle in November of that year. He continued to represent Monaghan in the Irish Parliament until the Act of Union, and then sat for the same county in the House of Commons of the United Kingdom until his death in a Dublin Hotel. His son Richard Thomas Dawson succeeded as second Baron Cremorne in 1813.

His daughter Louisa married Charles Johnston Coote, illegitimate son of Charles Coote, 1st Earl of Bellomont and inheritor of Bellamont House.

Parliament of the United Kingdom
Preceded by Parliament of Ireland	Member of Parliament for County Monaghan; 1801 – 1807; With: Warner Westenra 1801; Charles Powell Leslie II from 1801	Succeeded by Charles Powell Leslie II; Thomas Charles Stewart Corry
