= Alexander Montgomery (1667–1722) =

Irish soldier and MP

Member of Parliament for County Monaghan
- In office 1713–1722
- Preceded by: William Barton
- Succeeded by: Thomas Coote

Personal details
- Born: 1667 Ballyleck, Monaghan
- Died: 25 March 1722 (aged 54 or 55) Ballyleck, Monaghan
- Party: Whig
- Spouse: Elizabeth Cole
- Children: 7, including Thomas and John
- Education: Trinity College Dublin
- Occupation: Politician
- Profession: Soldier

Colonel Alexander Montgomery (1667 – 25 March 1722) was an Irish soldier and MP.

His father was Major John Montgomery of Crogan, County Donegal. Alexander joined the British Army and was promoted a captain of the Inniskilling Dragoons in 1689, a major in 1704 and a lieutenant colonel in 1706. He was a captain of dragoons in the Monaghan Militia in 1708.

He was appointed High Sheriff of County Monaghan for 1718 and elected M.P. for County Monaghan, sitting from 1713 to 1722.

He married Elizabeth Cole, the daughter of Thomas Cole, Esquire of Mount Florence, County Fermanagh. Elizabeth's dowry was the Ballyleck estate in County Monaghan, where Colonel Montgomery then took up residence, thus founding the line of Montgomery of Ballyleck. They had four sons and three daughters, viz.

- Thomas Montgomery, M.P. for Lifford, County Donegal.
- John Montgomery, M.P. and High Sheriff for County Monaghan.
- Matthew Montgomery, who was killed by a fall, unmarried.
- Reverend Robert Montgomery of Brandrum, County Monaghan.
- Dorcas, who married Christopher Irvine
- Sarah, who married Godfrey Wills
- Elizabeth Montgomery, who married John Moutray of Favour Royal, County Tyrone.

Montgomery died on 15 March 1722 and his will dated 28 August 1721 was proved on 6 July 1722. He disinherited Thomas, his eldest son, for marrying without consent and left Ballyleck to his second son, John.

The Montgomery Manuscripts written in 1704 states

"Alexander Montgomery is the second grandson of Reverend Alexander Montgomery, Prebendary of Doe, County Donegal. He was a Captain in ye 3rd regiment, and now in 1704 a major because it was not reduced: married Captain Coles (in ye County of Monaghan) his daughter and heiress, and now lives within two miles of Monaghan town, and hath a son, this gentleman hath a good Estate, and is a thriving man and a great tenant to ye present Duke of Ormond".
