= Richard Thomas Dawson, 2nd Baron Cremorne =

Irish peer

Richard Thomas Dawson, 2nd Baron Cremorne (31 August 1788 – 21 March 1827) was an Irish peer.

== Biography ==
The only son of Richard Dawson of Dawson Grove, in 1807 he succeeded his father as heir-presumptive to his great-uncle Thomas Dawson, 1st Viscount Cremorne. He was educated at Harrow School and St John's College, Cambridge.

Dawson was elected unopposed to Parliament for County Monaghan in 1812 and sat until he succeeded as second Baron Cremorne on 1 March the following year. On 10 March 1815 he married Anne Elizabeth Emily, daughter of John Whaley of Whaley Abbey; they had two sons.

One of his sisters, Louisa married Charles Johnston Coote, an illegitimate son of Charles Coote, 1st Earl of Bellomont and inheritor of Bellamont House.

Parliament of the United Kingdom
Preceded by Charles Powell Leslie II; Thomas Charles Stewart Corry	Member of Parliament for County Monaghan; 1812–1813; With: Charles Powell Leslie II	Succeeded by Charles Powell Leslie II; Thomas Charles Stewart Corry
Peerage of Ireland
Preceded by Thomas Dawson	Baron Cremorne; 1813–1827	Succeeded by Richard Dawson
