= Westenra =

Westenra is an Irish surname, derived from the Dutch van Wassenaer. Notable people with the surname include:

- Derrick Westenra, 5th Baron Rossmore (1853–1921), Irish soldier and author
- Hayley Westenra (born 1987), New Zealand soprano
- Henry Westenra, 3rd Baron Rossmore (1792–1860), Irish Member of Parliament and peer
- Henry Westenra (1742–1801), Irish Member of Parliament for Monaghan
- Henry Westenra, 4th Baron Rossmore (1851–1874), Irish soldier and peer
- John Westenra (1798–1874), Irish Member of Parliament for King's County
- Peter Westenra (died 1693), Irish Member of Parliament for Athboy
- Warner Westenra (1706–1772), Irish Member of Parliament for Maryborough
- Warner Westenra, 2nd Baron Rossmore (1765–1842), Irish landowner and politician

Fictional people:

- Lucy Westenra, a character in the 1897 novel Dracula
