= Mary Reid =

Mary Reid may refer to:

- Mary Reid (activist) (1953–2003), Irish activist, socialist and poet
- Mary Reid Macarthur (1880–1921), Scottish suffragist and trades unionist
- Mary Hiester Reid (1854–1921), American-born Canadian painter and teacher
- Mary Martha Reid (1812–1894), Florida's "most famous nurse and Confederate heroine"
- Mary Greyeyes-Reid (1920–2011), first woman of the First Nations to join the Canadian Women's Army Corps
- Mary E. Wrinch (1878–1969), British-Canadian artist

== Fictional characters ==
- Mary Reid, a character in the UK TV soap opera Brookside, played by Carolyn Jordan

== See also ==
- Mary Read (?–1721), pirate
- Mary Reed (disambiguation)
- Mary Read (disambiguation)
- Mary Rede, former name of British poet and novelist Mary Grimstone
