= Henry Westenra =

Henry Westenra may refer to:

- Henry Westenra (died 1801), MP for Monaghan Borough (Parliament of Ireland constituency)
- Henry Westenra, 3rd Baron Rossmore (1792–1860), Anglo-Irish Member of Parliament and peer
- Henry Westenra, 4th Baron Rossmore (1851–1874), Anglo-Irish soldier and peer
