= Monaghan Town Hall =

Municipal building in Monaghan, County Monaghan, Ireland

- Halla an Bhaile Muineachán
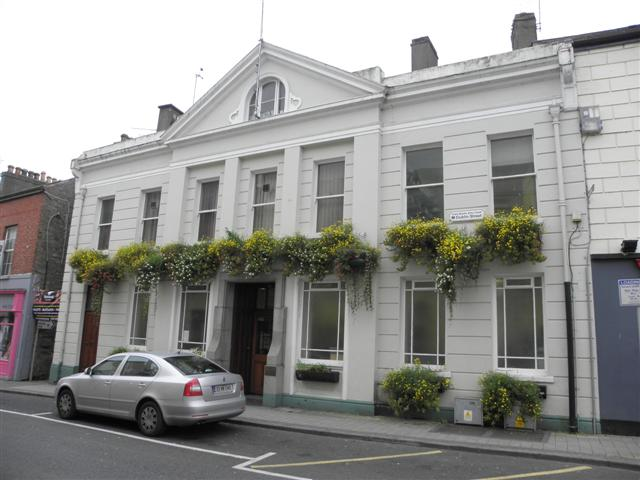
- Monaghan Town Hall

- Location within Ireland

General information
- Architectural style: Neoclassical style
- Location: Dublin Street, Monaghan, Ireland
- Coordinates: 52.8650°N 8.1994°W
- Completed: c.1880

Design and construction
- Architects: Bradbury & Evans (refurbishment in 1930)

Monaghan Town Hall (Irish: Halla an Bhaile Muineachán), is a municipal building in Dublin Street, Monaghan, County Monaghan, Ireland. The building is currently used by Monaghan County Council as local municipal offices.

== History ==
=== The first town hall ===
The first town hall in Monaghan was a narrow, terraced building commissioned by Derrick Westenra, 5th Baron Rossmore which faced onto The Diamond. It was designed by William Hague in the Italianate style, built in red brick with stone dressings and was completed in September 1882.

It featured a stone portico and was fenestrated by round headed windows on the ground and first floors and by segmental headed windows on the second floor. It was surmounted by a modillioned pediment with a coat of arms of the Westenra family, carved in red sandstone, in the tympanum. It became the meeting place of the town commissioners when they took office in the mid-19th century and then became the offices and meeting place of Monaghan Urban District Council when it was formed in 1900. After the council moved out of the building in 1929, it was used as a cinema, and later served as a function suite for the adjacent Westenra Arms Hotel.

=== The current town hall ===
The current building, located in Dublin Street was commissioned as a branch of the Belfast Banking Company. It was designed in the neoclassical style, built in stone and was officially opened as a bank branch in around 1880. The design involved a symmetrical main frontage of seven bays facing onto Dublin Street. The central section of three bays, which was slightly projected forward, featured a square headed doorway with an architrave flanked by casement windows; there were three sash windows on the first floor, all flanked by pilasters supporting a cornice, an entablature and a pediment, with a round headed window supported by scrolls in the tympanum. The outer sections of two bays each were fenestrated by casement windows on the ground floor and by sash windows on the first floor, and surmounted by a cornice, an entablature and a parapet.

Following Irish independence, the bank's branches in the newly established Irish Free State were sold to the Royal Bank of Ireland. The branch in Monaghan was surplus to requirements and was sold to the district council, which was seeking larger premises, in 1929. An extensive programme of alterations, which included the construction of an extension at the rear of the original building, was carried out to a design by Bradbury and Evans at that time.

The building was regularly used as a venue for public meetings: in the 1930s, the leader of the National Centre Party, James Dillon, addressed a large meeting of the famers there. Then on 18 December 1991, during The Troubles, two firebombs were planted by loyalists behind the building.

The building continued to be used as the offices of the urban district council until 2002, and then as the offices of the successor town council, but ceased to be the local seat of government in 2014, when the council was dissolved and administration of the town was amalgamated with Monaghan County Council in accordance with the Local Government Reform Act 2014. A further major programme of refurbishment works was subsequently carried out by Demac Construction at a cost of €1.25 million to a design by Keys and Monaghan Architects. The works, which included demolition of the 1929 extension, were completed in November 2019.
