= Rossmore Forest Park =

Park on the Cavan-Monaghan county border, Ireland

Coordinates: 54.228°N 6.997°W

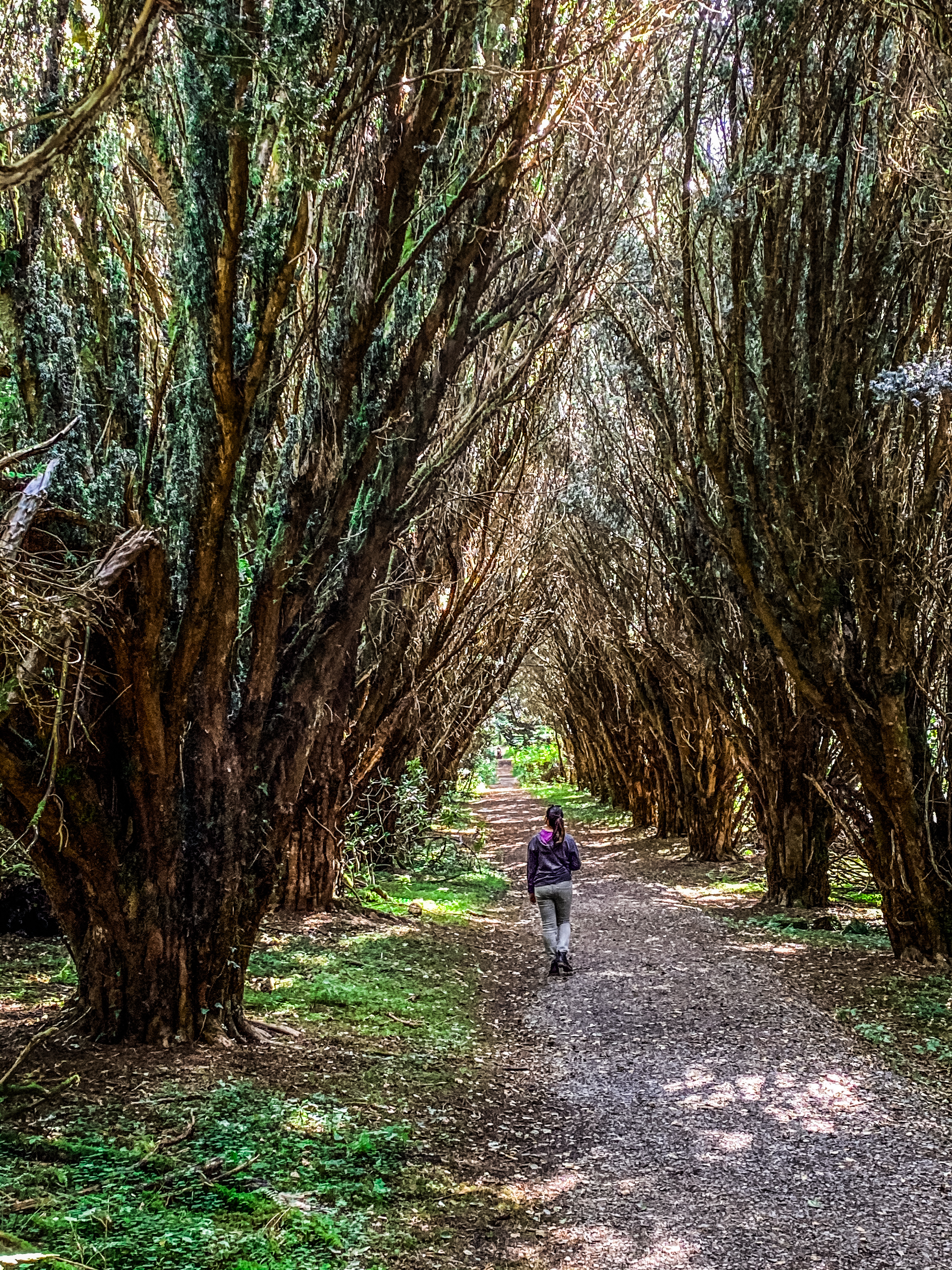

- Location within Ireland
- Location: County Monaghan, Ireland
- Governing body: Coillte

Rossmore Forest Park is a national forest park located in County Monaghan in Ireland run by the Irish States forestry organisation, Coillte. It is situated approximately 5km outside Monaghan town and has its main entrance on the R189 Threemilehouse/Newbliss Road.

== History ==
The park was the site of Rossmore Castle, which was demolished in the 1970s. It was the home of Lord Rossmore and the Rossmore family, who were the local landlords of the area during the 18th and 19th centuries. The park also includes a number of historical sites, including a wedge tomb and a court tomb.

== Wildlife ==
The park is home to a variety of native mammal species, including otters, pigmy shrews, and five species of bat. The park hosts migratory birds, both over winter and the summer.

== Amenities ==
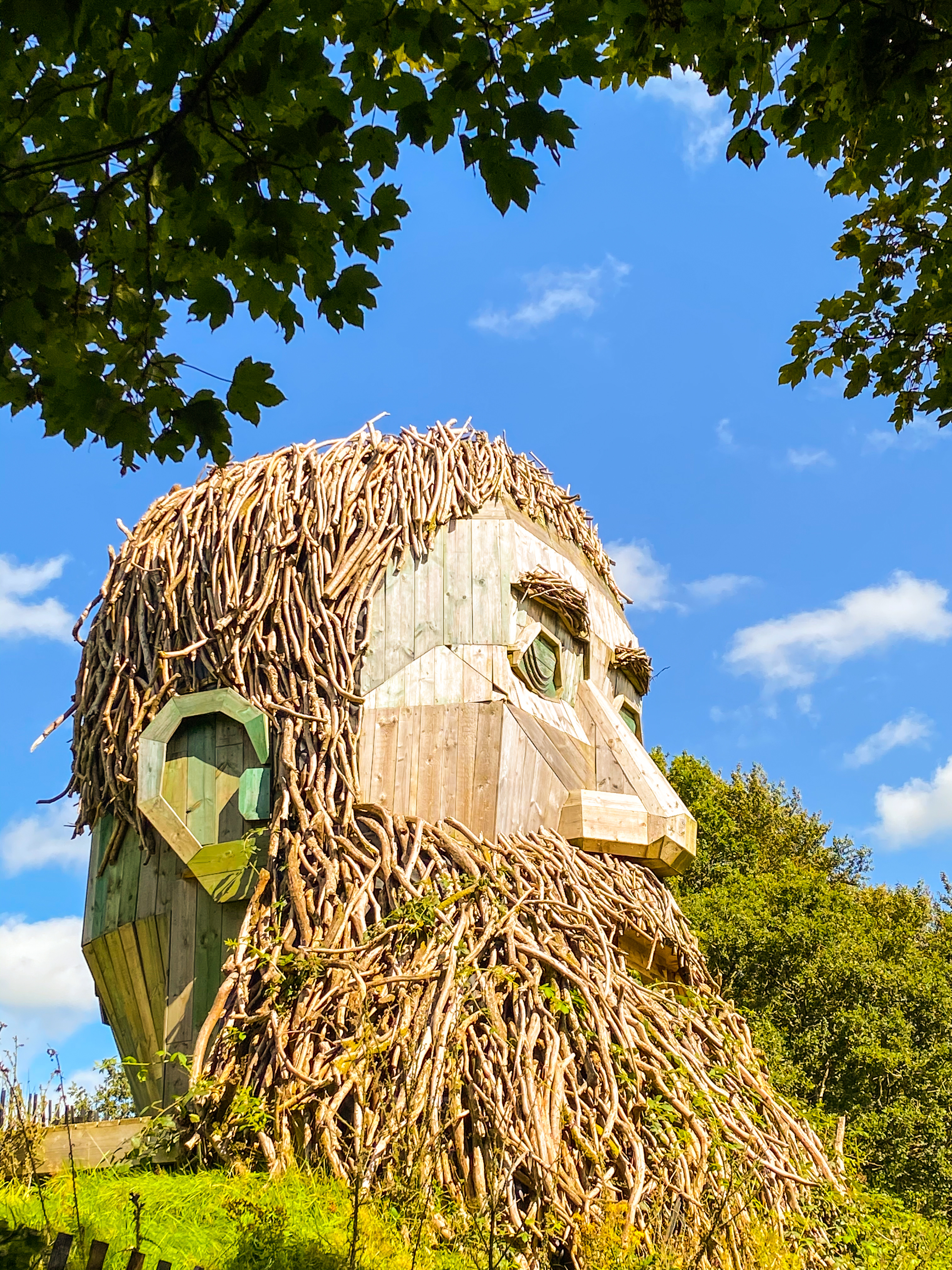
Wooden sculpture in the Park

The park is primarily used for recreational purposes and has several walking trails across 320 hectares. Amongst its trees and plant life are Californian redwoods planted at various locations. One of these Redwoods is situated near the entrance gate. The park also has an adjoining 18 hole golf course of Rossmore Golf Club.

The 2007 horror film Shrooms was filmed here.

During the COVID-19 pandemic lockdowns, the Park became the second most visited forest park in Ireland between March and December 2020 according to Coillte. Visitor numbers rose from 10,399 in February 2020 to 24,713 in December 2020. In 2021, it was announced that the Park would receive funding for improved facilities, along with the 30 other Coillte parks across Ireland.
