= Mary Reed =

Mary Reed may refer to:

- Mary Reed (missionary) (1854–1943), American missionary to India
- Mary Reed (writer) (fl. 1990s–2010s), co-writer of the John, the Lord Chamberlain series of historical mystery novels
- Mary Lou Reed (born 1930), American politician and environmentalist
- Mary Lynn Reed (born 1967), American mathematician, intelligence researcher, and short fiction writer

== See also ==
- Mary Reid (disambiguation)
- Mary Read (disambiguation)
