= Duivenvoorde Castle =

Castle in Voorschoten, Netherlands

- Voorschoten, the Netherlands
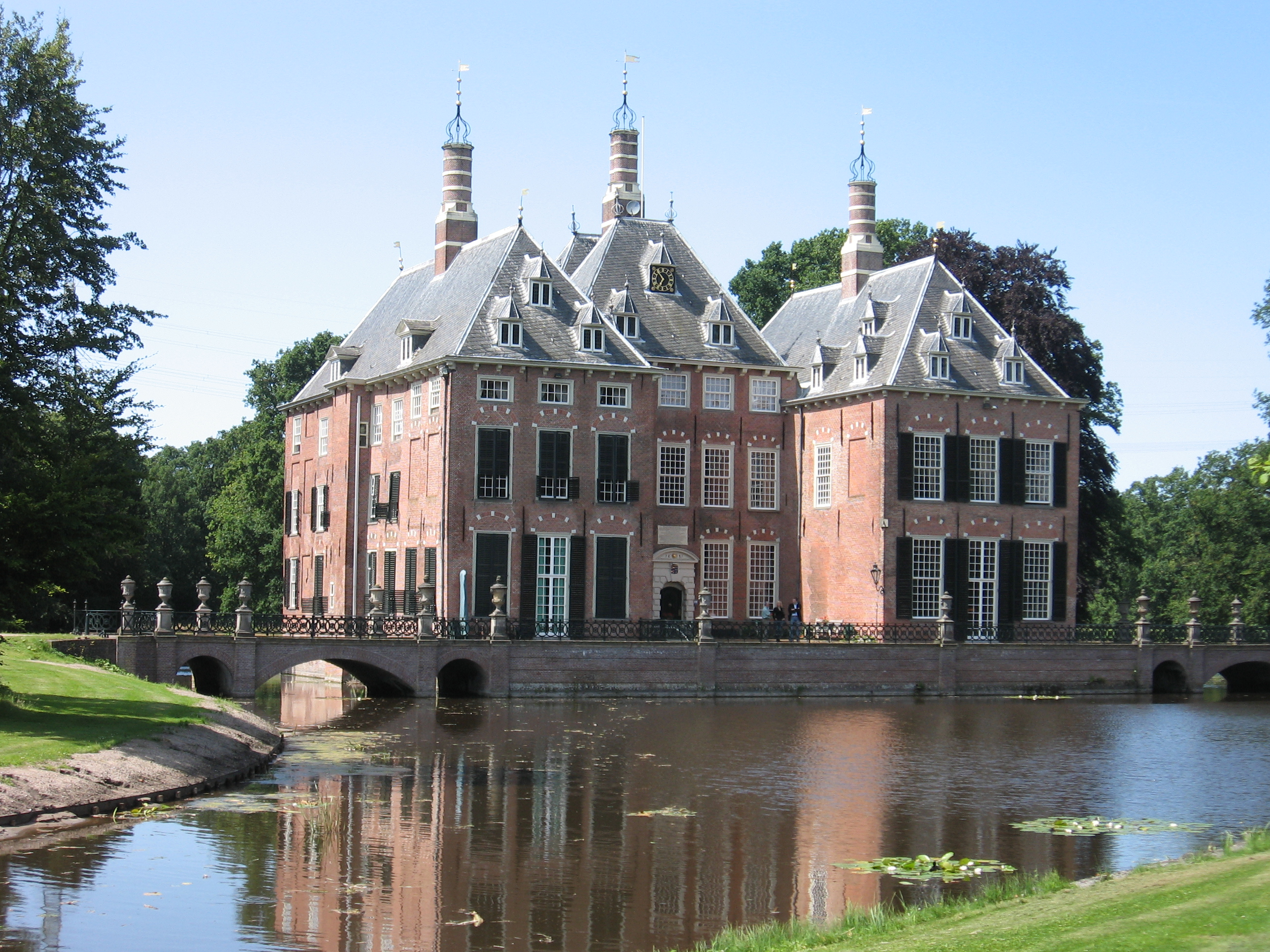
- Kasteel Duivenvoorde

Site information
- Type: Castle
- Open to the public: Yes, partly
- Condition: Good

Location
- The Netherlands
- Coordinates: 52°06′41″N 4°25′03″E

Site history
- Built: 1226

Duivenvoorde Castle (Dutch: Kasteel Duivenvoorde) is a castle in the town of Voorschoten, South Holland, in the Netherlands. It was first mentioned in 1226, making it one of the oldest castles in South Holland.

The castle is remarkable in that it has never been sold, which can be said of very few Dutch castles. It has passed by inheritance through several noble houses, sometimes through the matrilineal line. For the first five centuries of its history, the castle was owned by one family, the Van Duivenvoordes, who gave their name – at that time, Van Duvenvoirde – to it. Although thus named, the Van Duvenvoirdes properly formed part of the House of Wassenaer, an ancient noble family which has played an important role in Dutch history. Towards the end of the 17th century an owner of Duivenvoorde Castle, Johan van Duvenvoirde, readopted the name of Van Wassenaer. Therefore, although the same family remained in the House, this was under a different name.

== The Roman plaques ==
In 1717, two Roman stones were installed as plaques in the front hall. The larger of the two stones, dated between 196 and 198 AD, has an inscription on the front about the repair of an armory by Roman troops; the text on the other side is older, dating from somewhere between 103 and 111 AD. In the making of the newer text, the stone was made smaller, damaging the older text.

The smaller stone has a text which, through knowledge of the people named there in, can date the stone to around 205 AD.

Legend holds that both stones come from Brittenburg, the presumed Roman ruins that resurfaced above water off the coast of Katwijk in 1520. However, this cannot be true of the larger stone, because a military chronicle discovered in 1517 was indisputably taken from the text inscribed on it, implying that the stone was one found in 1502 while plowing a piece of land near the Monastery of Roomburg.

== Current status ==
The last private owner of the castle was Jonkvrouwe Ludolphine Henriette, Baroness Schimmelpenninck van der Oye (1891-1965). Knowing that with her death the house would be sold and the furniture dispersed, including the collections of portraits, porcelain and clothing and textiles, she decided to close the house and leave it in the care of a foundation for restoration. The stated aim was to restore the castle to its appearance in 1717, although in practice this has not always been possible. The terrace constructed around 1844 has been kept, and the opening of previously sealed windows to allow more light into the living room has taken away some symmetry. The interior has been redecorated to match the colours of 1717, and later stucco on the ceilings has been left in place.

The Duivenvoorde Foundation aims to turn Kasteel Duivenvoorde into a museum and to put its historic contents on display to visitors. However, the central and north wings of the house have not been turned into the usual kind of museum and instead have been made to look as though they are still lived in, giving the visitor the impression of going back in time and walking around a house from which its 18th-century owners are only temporarily absent.

The south wing is still inhabited; Ludolphine Emilie van Haersma Buma, Baroness Schimmelpenninck van der Oye, has lived there since 2003. Her brother lives in the castle's garden house.

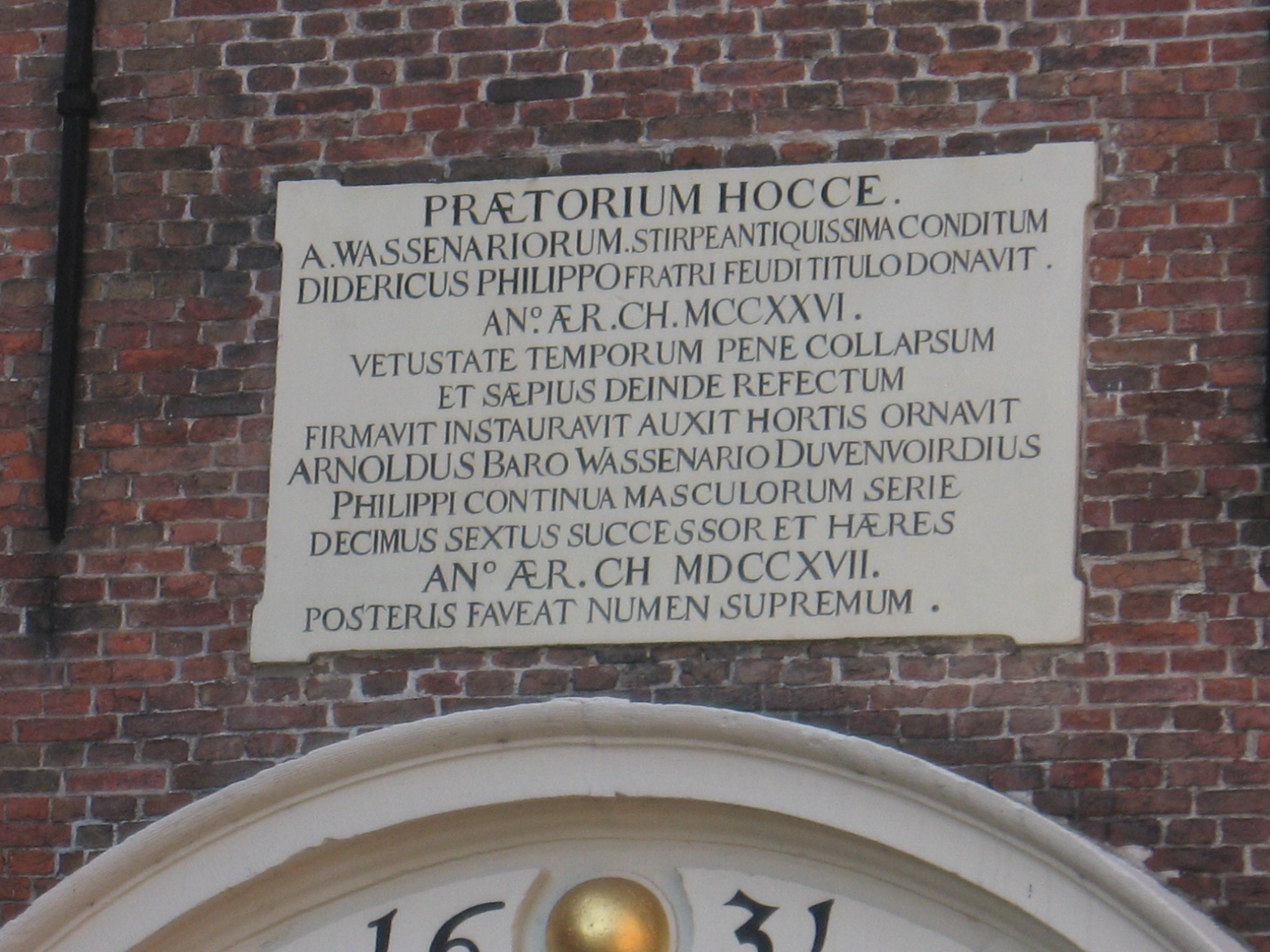
Latin inscription commemorating the restoration of 1717

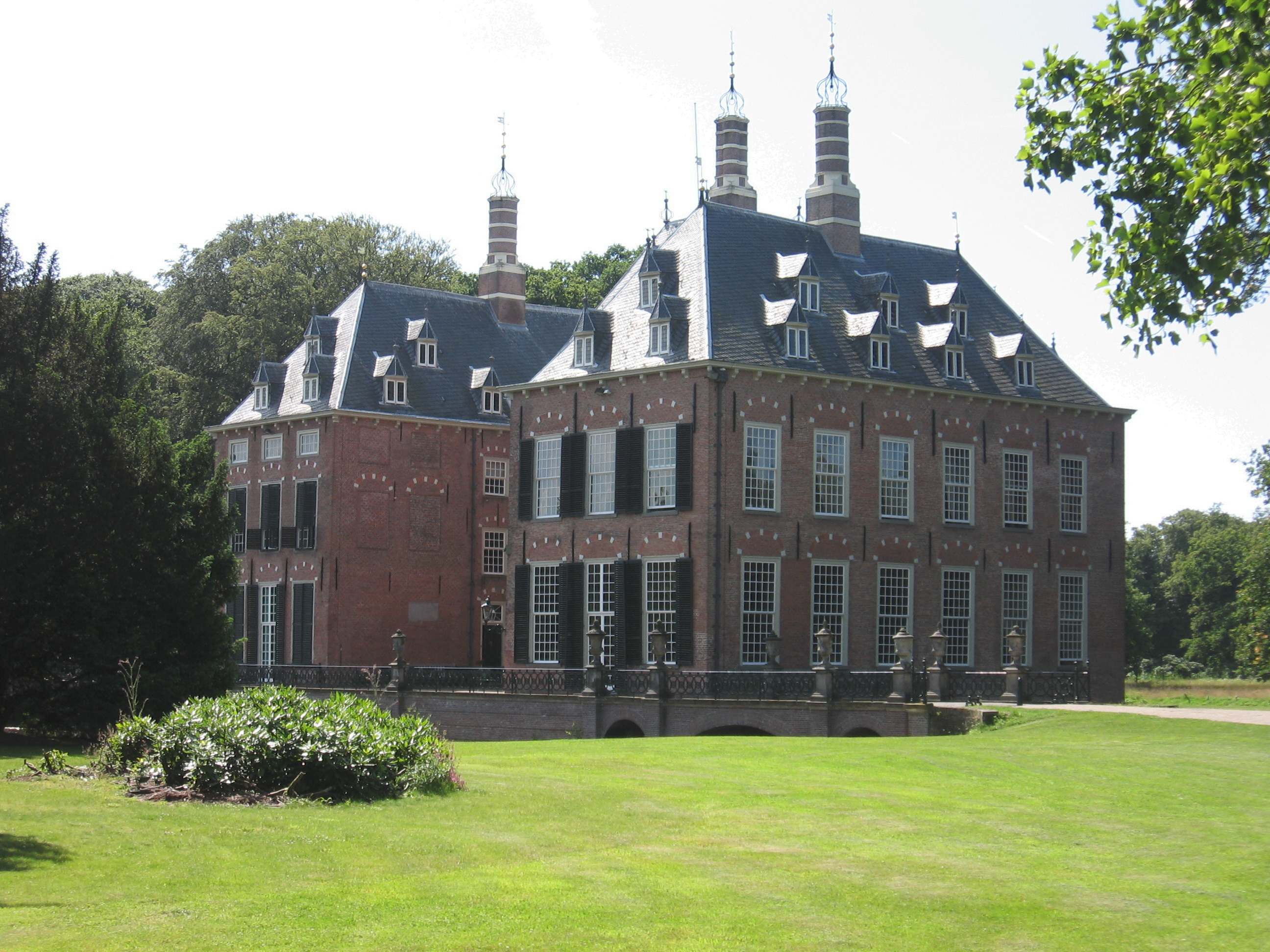
Kasteel Duivenvoorde

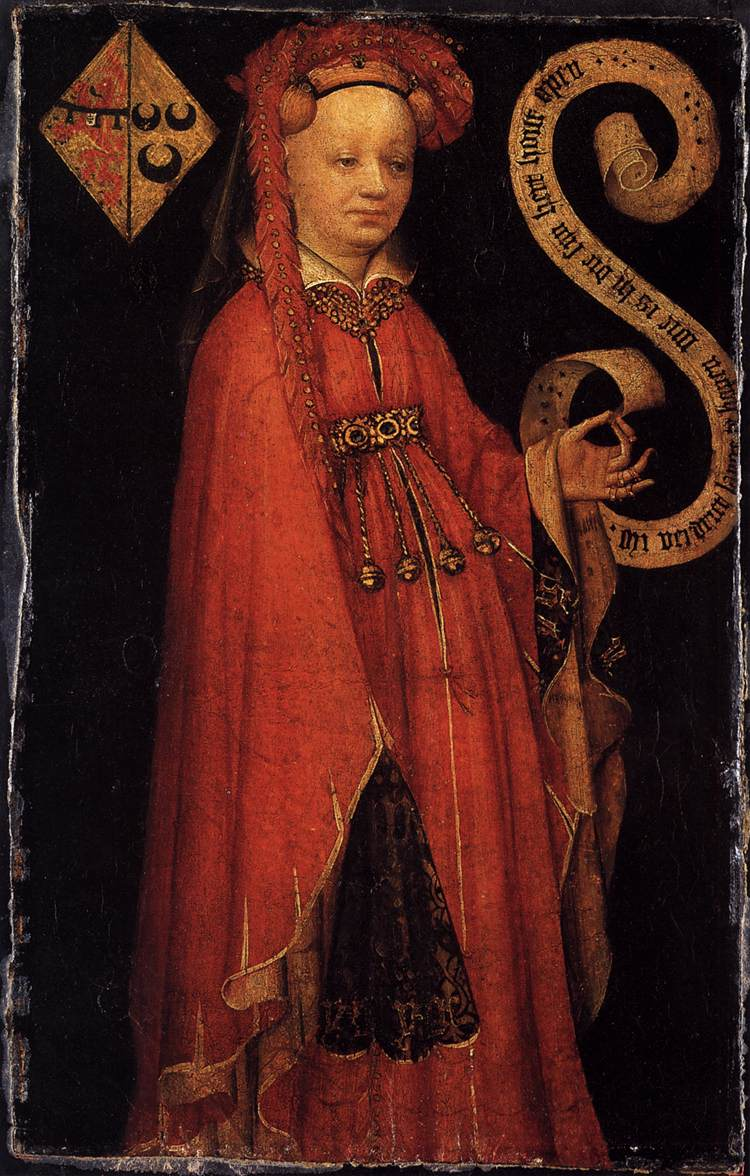
Portrait of Lysbeth van Duvoorde (?-1472) at the Museum Boijmans Van Beuningen, with this inscription : "Afbeeltsel van Juffer Lijsbeth van Duvoorde, Heer Dircks dochter".

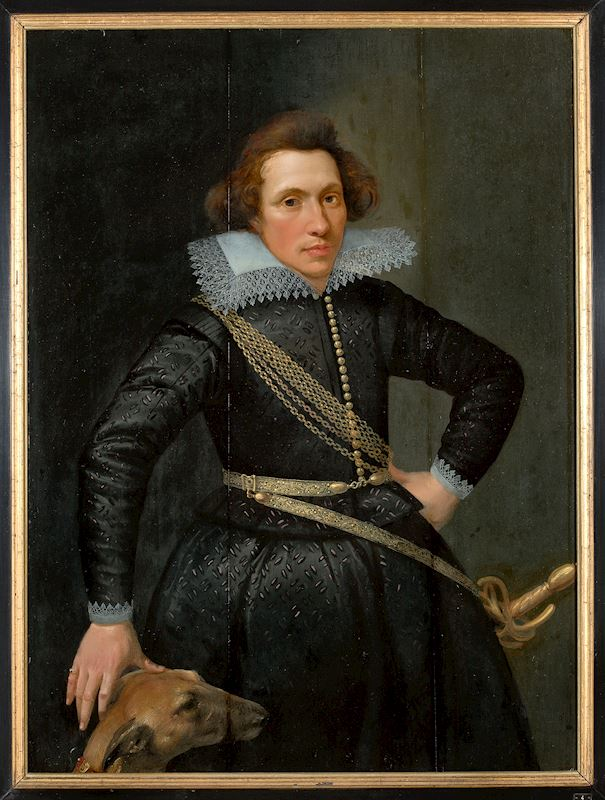
Owner: Johan van Wassenaer (1576-1645)

== See also ==
- List of castles in the Netherlands
