= Van Wassenaer =

Noble family

- Noble family
- Coat of arms
- Country: Netherlands
- Founded: 13th century
- Founder: Philips van Wassenaer
- Current head: Arent G.J. van Wassenaer
- Styles: Baron; Count †

The Wassenaer family is an old Dutch noble family. It was first mentioned in the County of Holland on 3 November 1200. They are one of the few original noble families from Holland that has survived to this day. Members of the family bear the title of baron and, in earlier times, also that of count.

== Origin of the name ==
The family was already noble from earliest times ("Uradel").

According to family legend, the name may be taken from the crescent (wassende) moon on the family coat of arms, borrowed from an Arabian banner that a member of the van Wassenaer family obtained while on a crusade.

According to some family archives, Wassenaar means Wasser Herren, Sea Lords/Kings, which had been a traditional title that the invading Romans (under Caligula) had recognized while destituting the kings of Batavia.

== History of the family ==
The founding father of the Wassenaer family was Philip, who lived in the early 13th century and owned lands in Wassenaar (current-day spelling). He was a vassal of William I, Count of Holland who took part in the Third Crusade and the Fifth Crusade.

=== Wassenaer branch ===
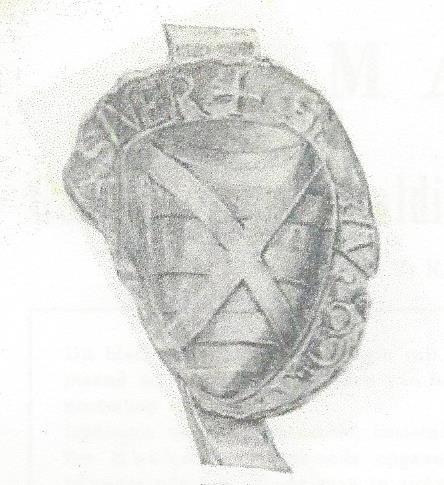
Seal of Dirk I (1226)

Philip's son Dirk I founded the branches van Wassenaer, van Cranenburch and van Groenevelt. A seal of Dirk I of 1226 shows a different coat of arms than his later coat of arms, but the crescent may have served as crest at the time. The van Wassenaer branch was made Burgraves of Leiden by the Counts of Holland in 1340. In 1544 this branch extinguished.

=== Duvenvoorde branch ===
Dirk's younger brother Filips received Duivenvoorde Castle in 1226 and founded the branch van Duvenvoirde. His son Arend I van Duvenvoorde (†1268) continued the main Van Duvenvoorde branch which in the 17th century resumed the name van Wassenaer.

=== Polanen Branch ===
Coat of arms of the House of Polanen

The Polanen branch descended from a younger brother of the Van Duvenvoorde branch. Arend I van Duvenvoorde had a younger brother Jan van Duvenvoirde (noted 1226–1248). He is the founding father of the Van Polanen branch. His son Philips III van Duivenvoorde (c. 1248 – after 1301) received the fief of Polanen (near Monster, South Holland) in 1295. His son Jan I van Polanen (c. 1285 – 1342) then named himself van Polanen. In the early phases of the Hook and Cod wars, the Van Polanen family, as well as their bastard Willem van Duvenvoorde led the Hook faction.

The Van Polanen branch played an important role later on. It was through the marriage of Johanna van Polanen with Engelbert I of Nassau, that the House of Nassau first gained territories in the Netherlands, namely Breda. Much later this fact, among others, led to the House of Orange-Nassau's rise to the ruling dynasty of the country.

=== Other branches ===
The Duvenvoirde branch ended with Jacoba Maria van Wassenaar, baroness of Torck (1709–1771) whose descendants in the female line, the barons Schimmelpenninck van der Oye, still today own Kasteel Duivenvoorde.

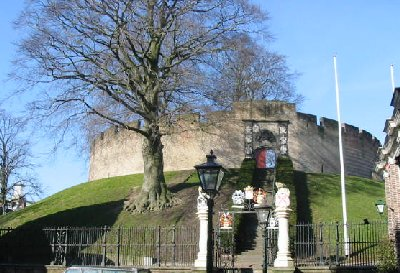
Leiden Castle

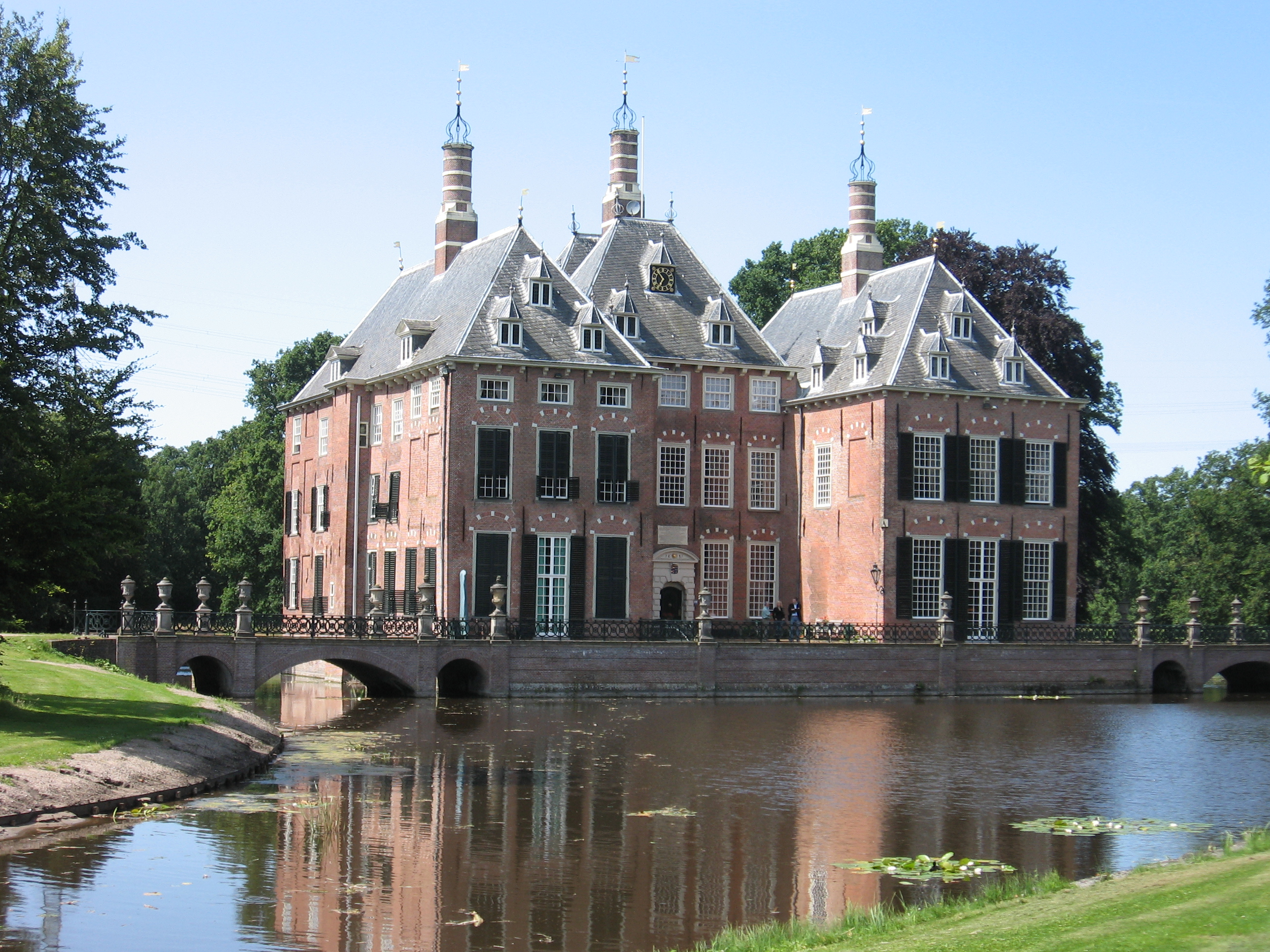
Duivenvoorde Castle

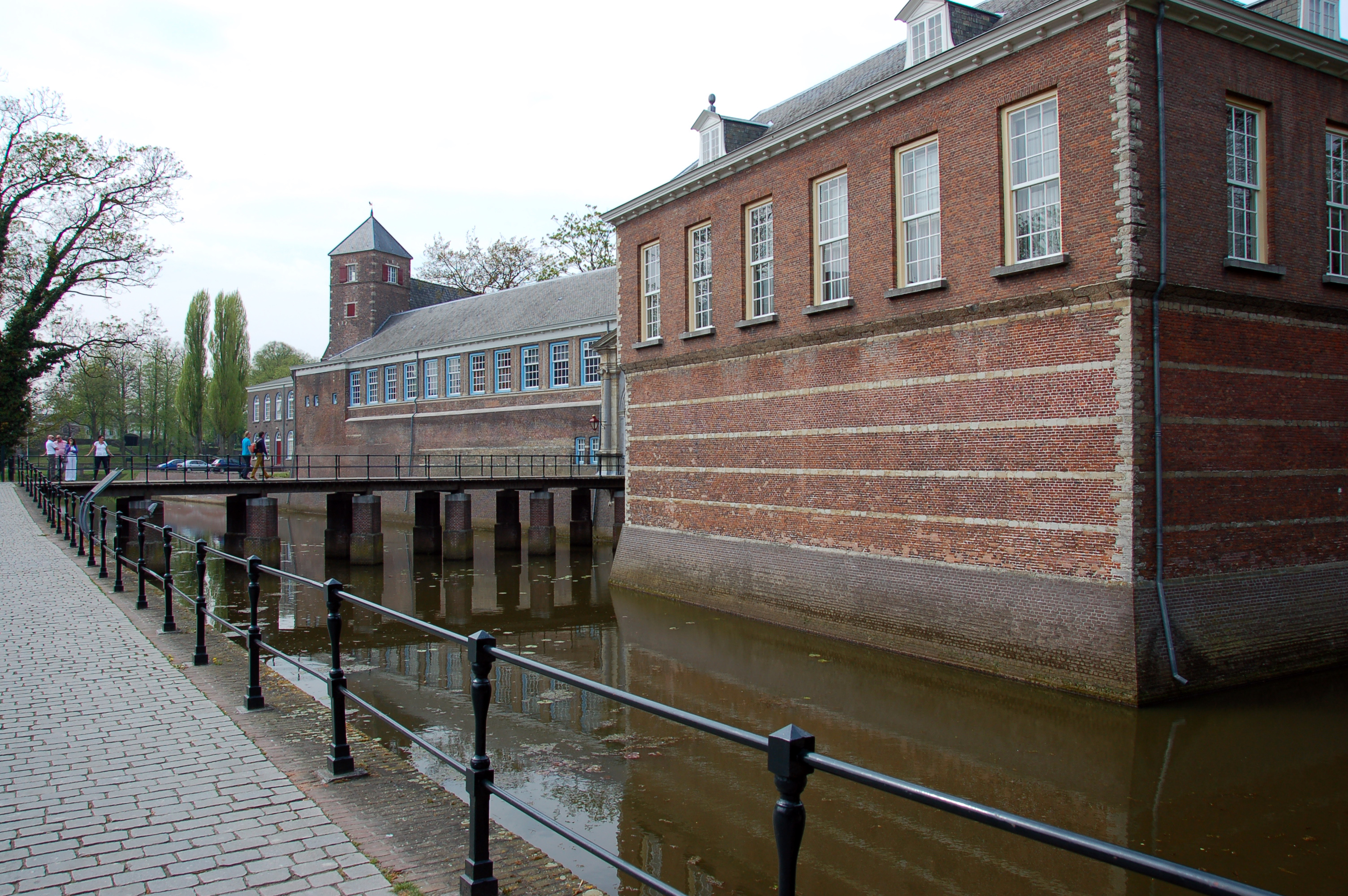
Breda Castle

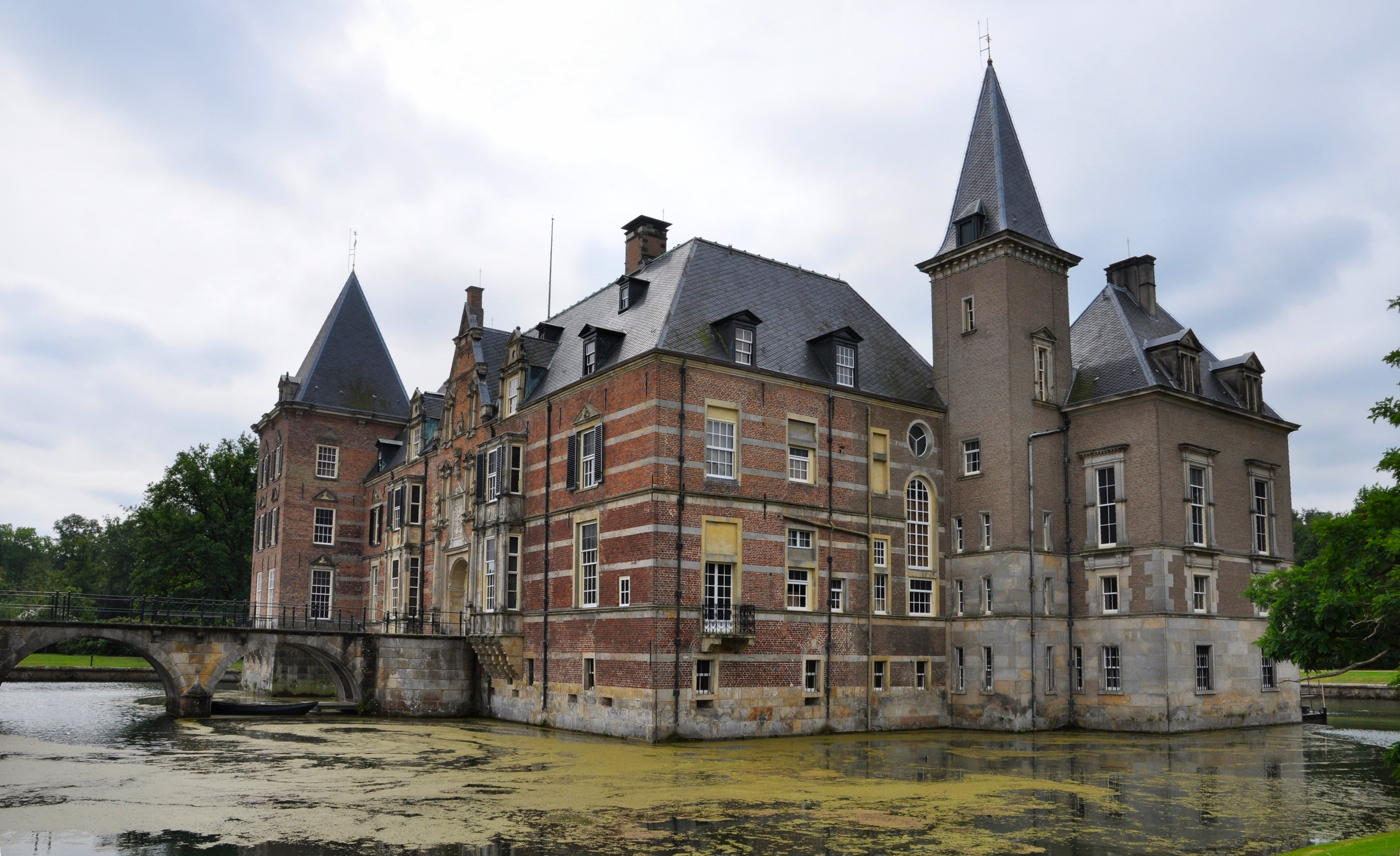
Twickel Castle

Jacob II van Wassenaer Obdam (1645–1714) married Adriana Sophia von Raesfeld in 1676, who inherited Twickel Castle near Delden. The branch van Wassenaer Opdam was elevated to the rank of (non-ruling) imperial counts in 1711. This branch extinguished in 1850 with Marie Cornélie van Wassenaer Obdam (1799–1850) who left the castle to her children, barons van Heeckeren van Kell, who took on the name van Heeckeren van Wassenaer. Baroness Marie Amélie van Heeckeren van Wassenaer, née countess van Aldenburg Bentinck (1879–1975), gave the castle to her family foundation in 1953. It is now administrated by the heirs of her grand nephew, count Christian zu Castell-Rüdenhausen (1952–2010).

Jacob van Wassenaer, Lord of Voorschoten, Duivenvoorde and Veur (1649–1707), married Jacoba van Lyere, heiress of Katwijk, thus founding the branch van Wassenaer tot Catwijck which is still existing. Furthermore, the castles of Hoekelum and Nederhemert were owned by Wassenaer family members until the late 20th century.

At the beginning of the 19th century, all family members were granted the title of baron in the Kingdom of the Netherlands.

== Famous scions of the House of Wassenaer ==
- Filips IV van Wassenaer, the 15th century Hook-favouring mayor of Leiden and viscount of Leiden.
- Jan II van Wassenaer (1483-1523), in the service of the Habsburgs, Order of the Golden Fleece and last viscount of Leiden.
- Jacob van Wassenaer Obdam, the 17th century admiral.
- Unico Wilhelm van Wassenaer, the 18th century diplomat and composer.

== Gallery ==
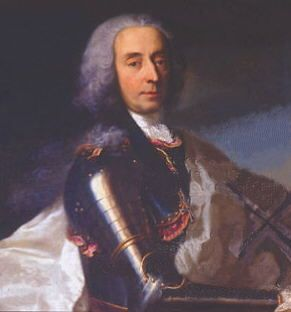
Unico Wilhelm van Wassenaer-Obdam as painted by George de Marees

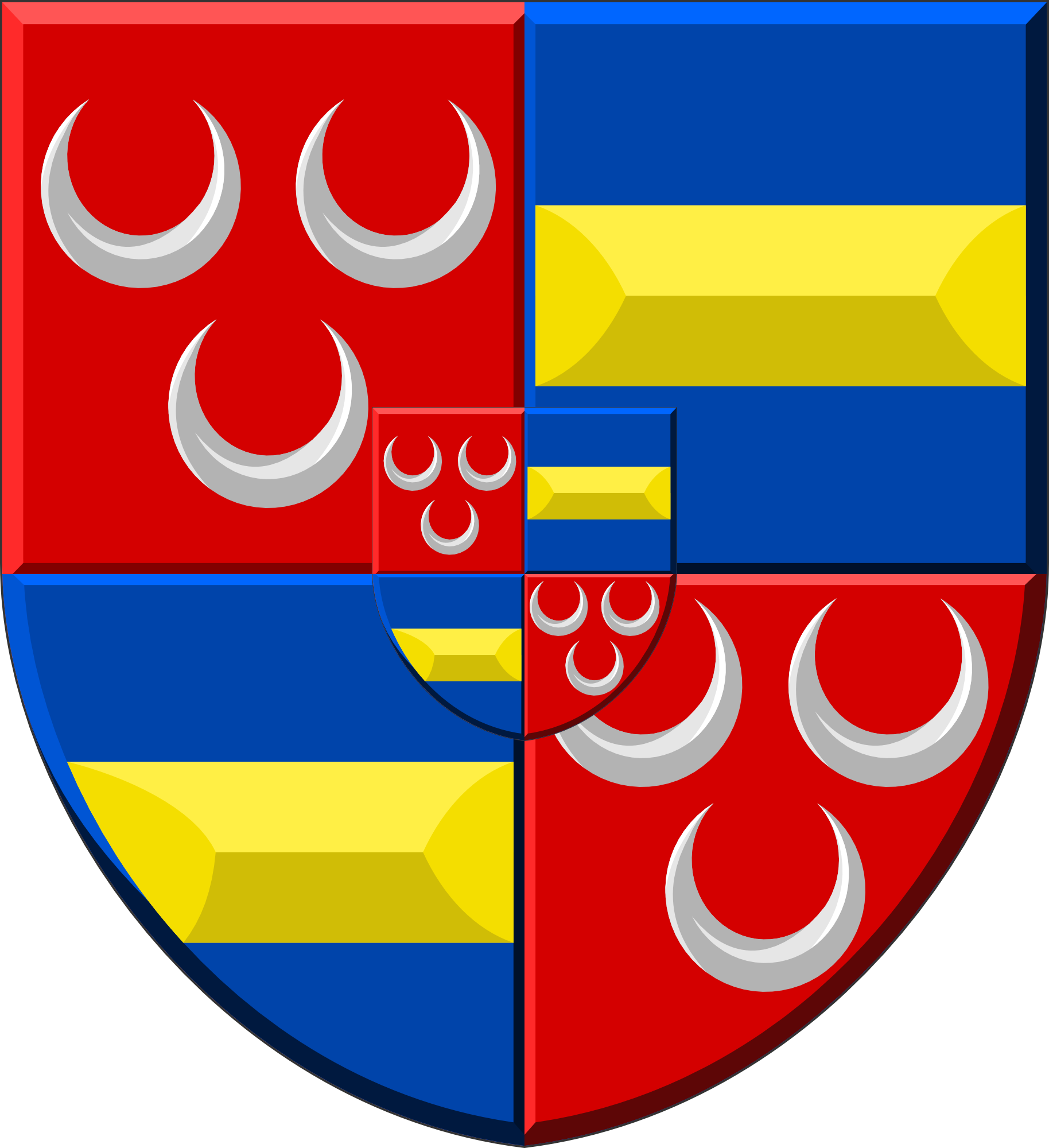
Wassenaer coat of arms

Coat of arms of the van Duvenvoorde family (or van Duvoorde)

Coat of arms of Willem van Duvenvoorde (or van Duvoorde)

== See also ==
- Wassenaar, a municipality in South Holland
- Westenra, an Irish surname derived from Van Wassenaer

== Literature ==
- J.C. Kort and R.C. Hol: Wassenaer, de oudste: Het archief van de familie Van Wassenaer van Duvenvoorde in Hollands archiefperspectief. Inventaris van het archief van de familie Van Wassenaer van Duvenvoorde, 1266–1996, Verloren b.v., Hilversum, 2002.
- Nederland's Adelsboek 97 (2012), p. 131-188.
