= Mary Read (disambiguation) =

Mary Read (?–1721) an 18th century English pirate.

Mary Read may also refer to:

- Mary Read, American victim of the Virginia Tech shooting
- Mary Read, in the 1961 adventure film Queen of the Seas, played by Lisa Gastoni
- Mary Read (play), English 1934 historical play about the pirate

== See also ==
- Mary Reed (disambiguation)
- Mary Reid (disambiguation)
- Mary Impey (née Reade), English historian
