= Gaelscoil Ultain =

- Monaghan, County Monaghan; Ireland

Information
- Established: Sruth Ultain 1986-1989; Gaelscoil Ultain 1989
- Principal: Joe Ó Gallchóir
- Enrollment: 386 (2024)
- Website: ultain.ie

Gaelscoil Ultain (Irish pronunciation: [ˈɡeːl̪ˠsˠkɛlʲ ˈʊl̪ˠt̪ˠənʲ]) is an Irish language primary education school founded in 1986 and situated on Clones Road in Monaghan, Ireland.

== History ==
Following an application in early 1986 to set up an all-Irish primary school in Monaghan town, the Department of Education authorised an all-Irish stream as part of St Mary's Boys National School. The first class of 23 children was based in the old Brothers' House adjacent to the St. Mary's building and commenced in September 1986.

The all-Irish stream, Sruth Ultain, continued for three years and in 1989, the department sanctioned an independent school, Gaelscoil Ultain. The school has since been situated in the Old Brothers’ School and was blessed by Dr. Joseph Duffy, Bishop of Clogher, in May 1990.

The school celebrated 25 years in existence in 2011 with a programme of events that included a St Patrick's Day parade in March, a 'Ceolchoirm Paistí' in April and a reunion event in June.

== Location ==
Having been in the Old Brother's school building at the top of the hill on the Clones Road since 1989, it was announced in 2009 that an educational campus on the site of the Army Barracks in Monaghan Town would be built. The school moved to this new building in 2013.
