= William Westenra, 7th Baron Rossmore =

Anglo-Irish noble (1931–2021)

The Right Honourable The Lord Rossmore

Member of the House of Lords
- Lord Temporal
- In office 31 January 1921 – 11 November 1999
- Preceded by: The 6th Baron Rossmore
- Succeeded by: Seat abolished (Note: Pursuant to the House of Lords Act 1999.)

Personal details
- Born: William Warner Westenra; 14 February 1931
- Died: 4 May 2021 (aged 90)

William Warner Westenra, 7th Baron Rossmore (14 February 1931 – 4 May 2021), known as Hon. William Westenra, and nicknamed Paddy, was an Anglo-Irish noble, photographer and author.

== Biography ==
Born at the family seat of Rossmore Castle, William Warner Westenra was educated at Scaitcliffe prep school and Eton College before reading Theology at Cambridge University. He inherited his father's title in 1958, by then his family's ancestral home had long been abandoned, due to dry-rot, and they instead lived in a dower house on the estate, which was sold in 1961 due to debts. A former gamekeepers house on the estate to which he moved was later destroyed by a fire started by the Irish Republican Army in 1981.

Following the end of his relationship with Marianne Faithfull, whose experience with drug addiction led him to support the founding of the Coolmine Therapeutic Community and drug treatment centre in 1973, he met and married Valerie Marion Tobin, in 1982 and their son, Benedict William was born in 1983. Westenra, upon his marriage to Tobin, adopted her daughter Charlotte, whose father was Leonard Whiting. Charlotte took the Westenra family name. He continued to work as a photographer and painter for many years. He later returned to Glin Castle where he had first encountered Faithfull and her then-boyfriend, Mick Jagger, to photograph the castle for an upcoming coffee table book.

His marriage to Valerie was dissolved, prior to his death in 2021. His son Benedict inherited the barony and assumed the title 8th Baron Rossmore upon it being proved.

== Notes ==
Peerage of the United Kingdom
Preceded by William Westenra	Baron Rossmore; 1958–2021; Member of the House of Lords (1958–1999)	Succeeded by Benedict Westenra
Peerage of Ireland
Preceded by William Westenra	Baron Rossmore; 1958–2021	Succeeded by Benedict Westenra
