= Rossmore Castle =

Former castle near Monaghan, Ireland

Coordinates: 54.22581667°N 6.998522222°W

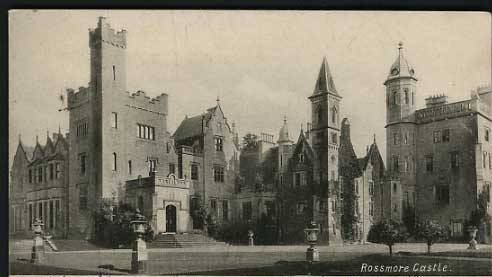
Rossmore Castle

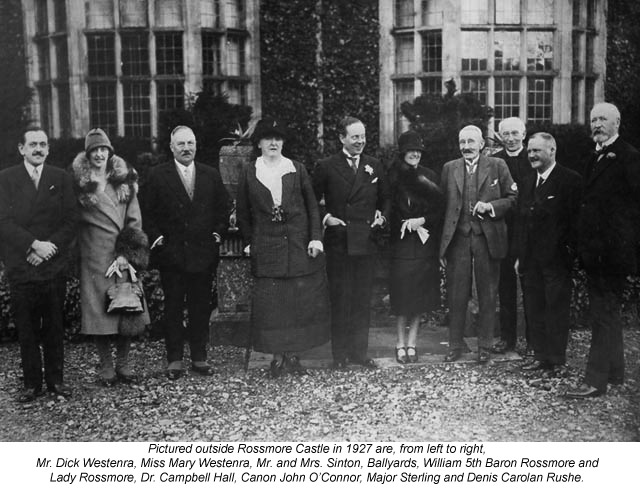
L to R: Mr. and Mrs. Dick Westenra, Mr. and Mrs. Maynard Sinton, Lord and Lady Rossmore, Dr. Hall, Canon O'Connor, Major Sterling and Denis Rushe at Rossmore Castle, 1927.

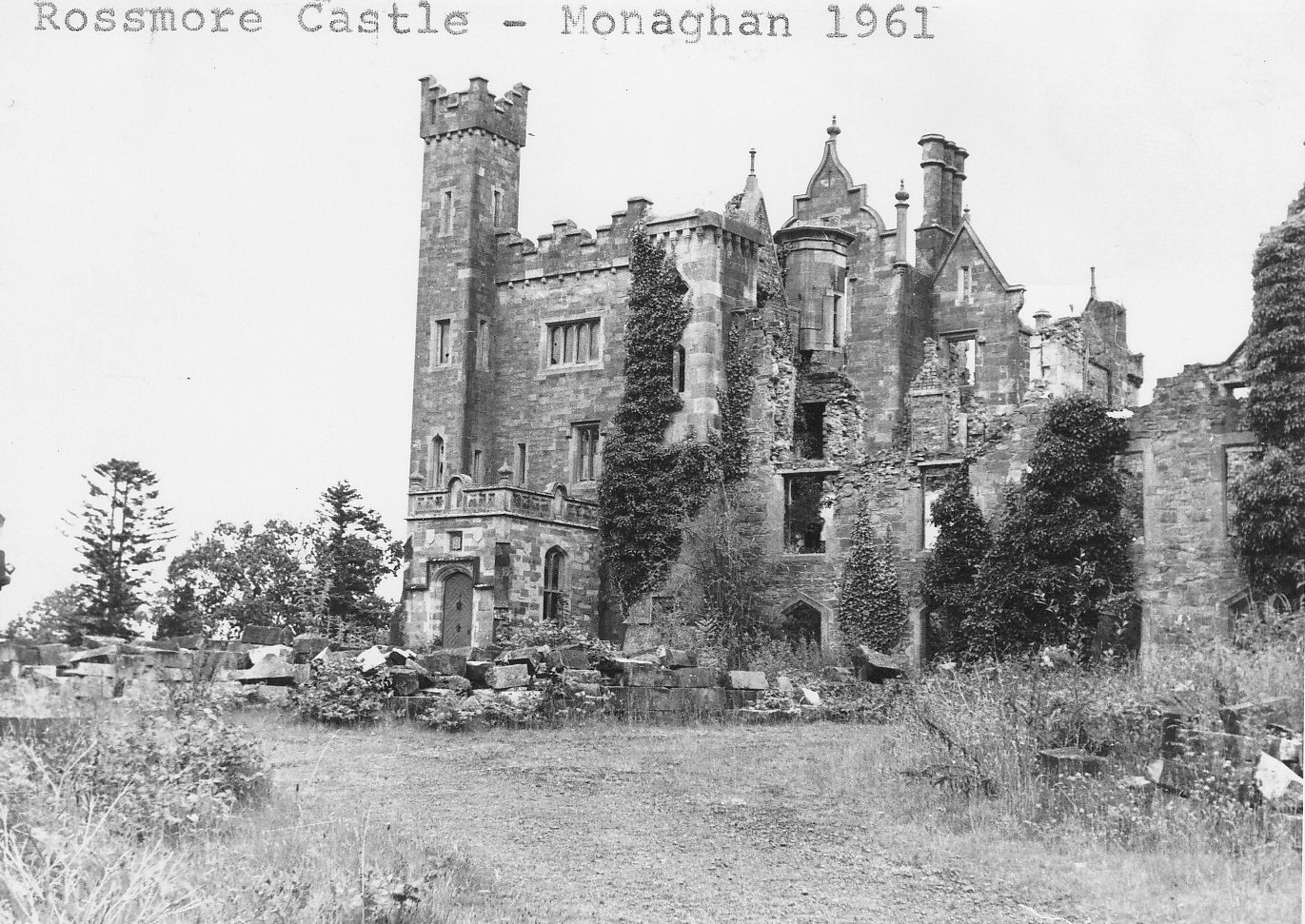
Rossmore Castle ruins in 1961

Rossmore Castle, also known as Rossmore Park, was a castle on the outskirts of Monaghan in County Monaghan, Ireland. It was built in the Gothic style in 1827 and was the seat of the Barons Rossmore, but fell into disrepair in the 1940s when the family moved to Camla Vale, and was demolished in the 1970s.

== History ==
The building was a 19th-century country house built in the style of a castle. It was originally built for The 2nd Baron Rossmore in 1827 in the Gothic style by the Irish architect William Vitruvius Morrison. The building was dominated by a large square tower with turret and crow-stepped battlements, and had a series of gables and oriel windows. It was extended and remodelled in 1858 by the Irish architect William Henry Lynn. There was rivalry between Lord Rossmore and the Shirleys of Lough Fea, and they competed for many years as to who could boast the largest room in County Monaghan; as a result, the drawing room at Rossmore was extended on five occasions, and the house ended up with three towers, and more than 117 windows in at least 53 assorted sizes and shapes. In latter part of the century was known for its social gatherings and gaiety, with Albert Edward, Prince of Wales, being a friend of The 5th Baron Rossmore. The 5th Baron was Lord Lieutenant of Monaghan from 1897 until his death in 1921, when he was succeeded by his son William, who became The 6th Baron Rossmore. After the Second World War, dry rot forced the abandonment of the castle; the family moved to Camla Vale, a more modest Georgian house situated within the estate grounds, and the castle fell into ruins; it was demolished in 1975. Camla Vale was sold in 1962 and has since been demolished.

On the death of Paddy Rossmore in 2021, 2,200 acres of the grounds and estate which made up the Rossmore Castle estate were bequeathed to An Taisce.

== See also ==
- Rossmore Forest Park
