= Baron Rossmore =

Title in the Peerage of Ireland

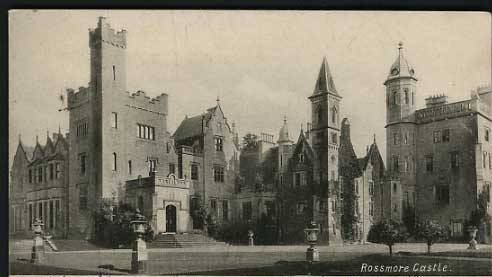
Rossmore Castle, seat of the Barons Rossmore.

Baron Rossmore, of Monaghan in the County of Monaghan, is a title in the Peerage of Ireland. It was created in 1796 for the soldier Robert Cuninghame, with remainder to his wife Elizabeth's nephews Henry Alexander Jones (the son of Theophilus Jones and Anne Murray, eldest sister of Elizabeth; Henry Alexander Jones died childless before his uncle Lord Rossmore) and Warner William Westenra, son of Henry Westenra and Harriet Murray, youngest sister of Elizabeth. Cuninghame was a General in the Army and served as Commander-in-Chief of Ireland. From January to August 1801 he also sat in the House of Lords as an Irish representative peer.

Lord Rossmore died childless (his death gave rise to the legend of the Rossmore banshee) and was succeeded according to the special remainder by his nephew Warner William Westenra, the second Baron. He represented County Monaghan in the British House of Commons and also served as Lord Lieutenant of Monaghan from 1831 to 1842. In 1838 he was created Baron Rossmore, of the County of Monaghan, in the Peerage of the United Kingdom. This gave the barons an automatic seat in the House of Lords. His eldest son, Henry Robert Westenra, the third Baron, represented Monaghan in Parliament as a Whig and was Lord Lieutenant of Monaghan from 1843 to 1852. Henry's younger son, the fifth Baron (who succeeded his elder unmarried brother), was Lord Lieutenant of Monaghan from 1897 to 1921. As of 2021 the titles are held by the latter's great-grandson, the eighth Baron, who succeeded his father in that year.

The Westenra family is of Dutch descent. Warner Westenra (died 1676) immigrated to Dublin and became an Irish subject. The seat of the Barons Rossmore was Rossmore Castle, County Monaghan. Warner Westenra, grandfather of the second Baron, represented Maryborough in the Irish Parliament. Henry Westenra, father of the second Baron, represented County Monaghan in the Irish Parliament. The Honourable John Westenra, third son of the second Baron, was member of parliament for King's County.

The family seat was Rossmore Park, near Monaghan, County Monaghan, in Ireland.

== Baron Rossmore (1796, 1838) ==
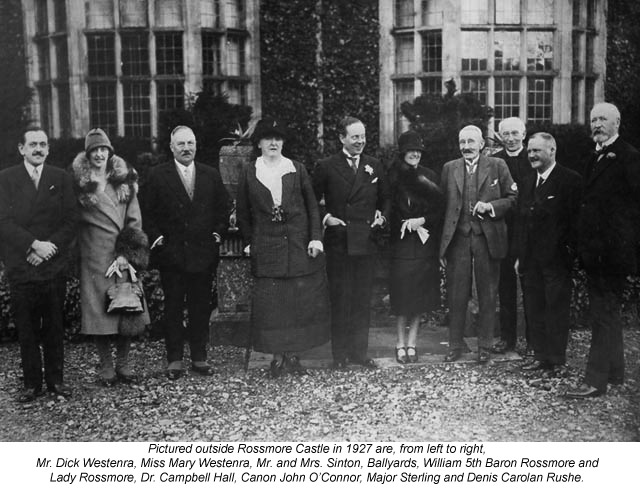
L–R: Mr. and Mrs. Dick Westenra, Mr. and Mrs. Maynard Sinton, Lord and Lady Rossmore, Dr. Campbell Hall, Canon O'Connor, Major Sterling and Denis Rushe at Rossmore Castle, 1927.

- Robert Cuninghame, 1st Baron Rossmore (1726–1801)
- Warner William Westenra, 2nd Baron Rossmore (1765–1842) (created Baron Rossmore [UK] in 1838)
- Henry Robert Westenra, 3rd Baron Rossmore (1792–1860)
- Henry Cairnes Westenra, 4th Baron Rossmore (1851–1874)
- Derrick Warner William Westenra, 5th Baron Rossmore (1853–1921)
- William Westenra, 6th Baron Rossmore (1892–1958)
- William Warner Westenra, 7th Baron Rossmore (1931–2021)
- Benedict William Westenra, 8th Baron Rossmore (born 1983)

There is currently no heir to the title.

=== Title succession chart ===
Title succession chart, Barons Rossmore (both creations)

Col. John Murray died 1743
Baron Rossmore (Ire, 1796)
Rt Hon. Theophilus Jones; 1729–1811	Anne Jones (née Murray) died 1827	Robert Cuninghame; 1st Baron Rossmore; 1726–1801	Elizabeth Cuninghame; Baroness Rossmore (née Murray) c. 1733 – 1824	Henry Westenra; 1742–1801	Harriet Westenra (née Murray)
Baron Rossmore (UK, 1838)
Henry A. Jones died b. 1801	Warner Westenra; 2nd Baron Rossmore; 1765–1842
Henry Westenra; 3rd Baron Rossmore; 1792–1860
Henry Westenra; 4th Baron Rossmore; 1851–1874	Derrick Westenra; 5th Baron Rossmore; 1853–1921
William Westenra; 6th Baron Rossmore; 1892–1958
William Westenra; 7th Baron Rossmore; 1931–2021
Benedict Westenra; 8th Baron Rossmore born 1983
