= Monaghan =

Town in County Monaghan, Ireland

Monaghan Muineachán (Irish)
- Town
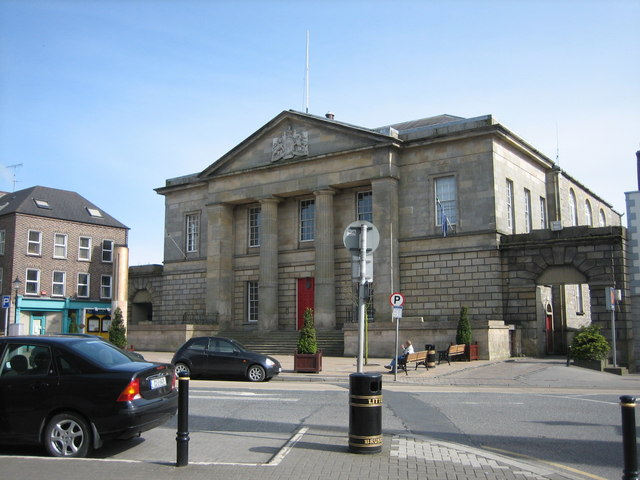
- Monaghan Courthouse

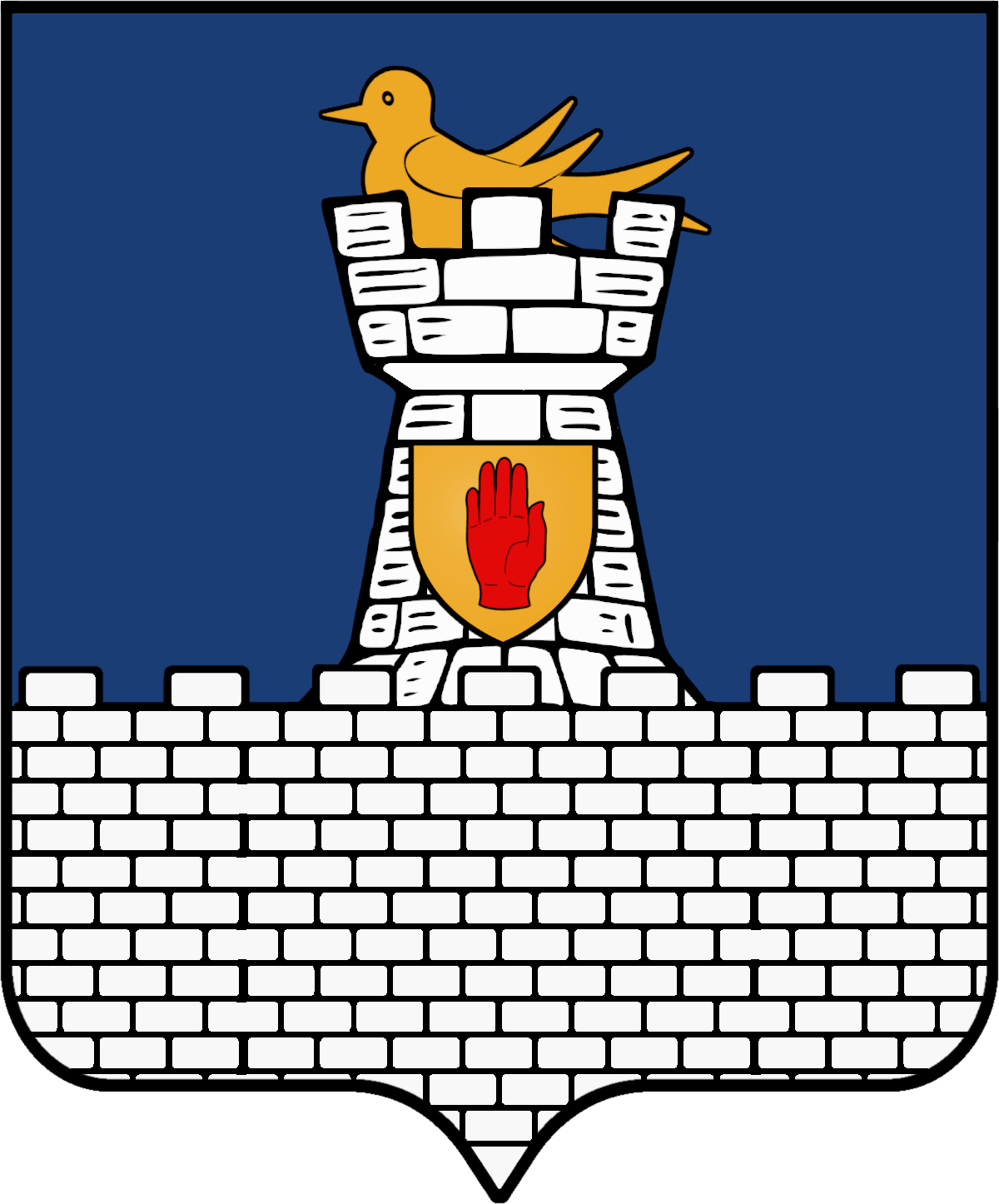
- Coat of arms

- Location in Ireland
- Coordinates: 54°14′52″N 06°58′15″W
- Country: Ireland
- Province: Ulster
- County: County Monaghan
- Barony: Monaghan
- Elevation: 71 m (233 ft)

Population (2022)
  - Urban: 7,894
- Time zone: UTC±0 (WET)
  - Summer (DST): UTC+1 (IST)
- Eircode routing key: H18
- Telephone area code: +353(0)47
- Irish Grid Reference: H666337

Monaghan (/ˈmɒnəhən/ MON-ə-hən; Irish: Muineachán [ˈmˠɪnʲəxaːnˠ]) is the county town of County Monaghan, Ireland. It also provides the name of its civil parish and Monaghan barony.

The population of the town as of the 2022 census was 7,894. The town is on the N2 road from Dublin to Derry and Letterkenny.

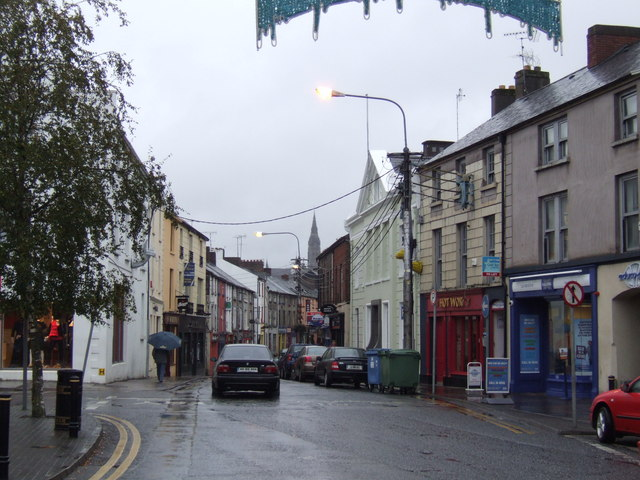
Dublin Street, Monaghan

== Etymology ==
The Irish name Muineachán derives from a diminutive plural form of the Irish word muine meaning "brake" (a thickly overgrown area) or sometimes "hillock". The Irish historian and writer Patrick Weston Joyce interpreted this as "a place full of little hills or brakes". Monaghan County Council's preferred interpretation is "land of the little hills", a reference to the numerous drumlins in the area.

== History ==
=== Early history ===
The Menapii Celtic tribe are specifically named on Ptolemy's 150 AD map of Ireland, where they located their first colony – Menapia – on the Leinster coast c. 216 BC. They later settled around Lough Erne, becoming known as the Fir Manach, and giving their name to Fermanagh and Monaghan. Mongán mac Fiachnai, a 7th-century King of Ulster, is the protagonist of several legends linking him with Manannan mac Lir. They spread across Ireland, evolving into historic Irish (also Scottish and Manx) clans.

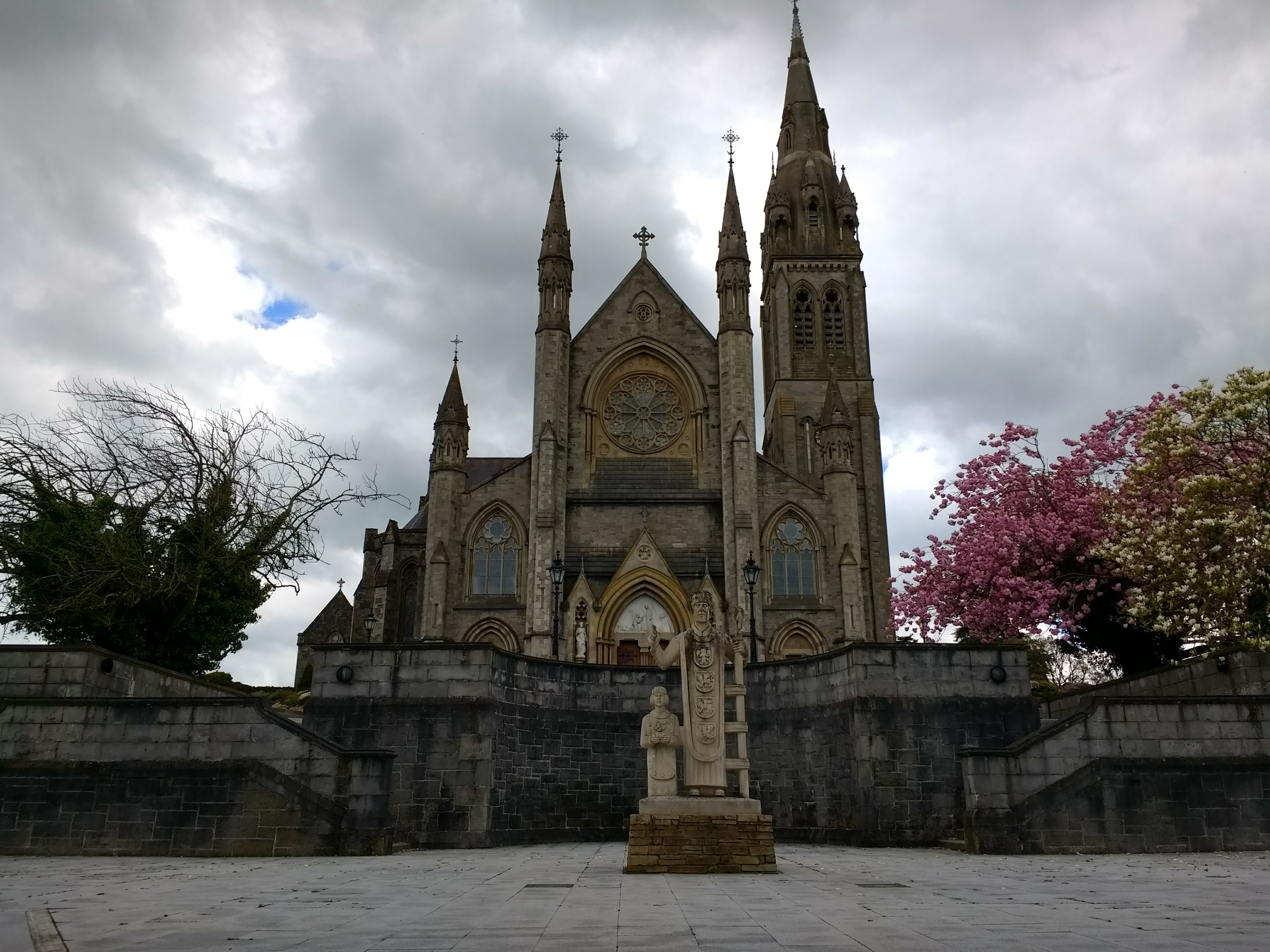
The northwestern side of St Macartan's Cathedral in Monaghan.

The Battle of Clontibret, fought between the forces of The Earl of Tyrone, An Ó Néill (The O'Neill), of Tír Eoghain, and the English Crown, was fought in northern County Monaghan in May 1595. The territory of Monaghan had earlier been wrested from the control of the MacMahon sept in 1591, when the leader of the MacMahons was hanged by authority of the Dublin government; this was one of the events that led to the Nine Years War and the Tudor conquest of Ireland.

In 1801, Monaghan Town, along with the rest of the Rossmore Estate, became the property of the Westenra family. The Rossmore Estate was inherited in August of that year by Warner Westenra, 2nd Baron Rossmore, from his uncle. The Westenra family remained as the principal landlords of Monaghan town up into the early twentieth-century. Their 'ancestral seat' was established at Rossmore Castle (also known as Rossmore Park), a large country house mainly built in stages during the nineteenth-century on the south-western edge of Monaghan Town. The castle was mainly built in the neo-Jacobean style of architecture.

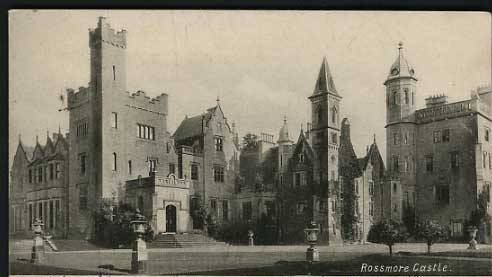
Rossmore Castle, former seat of the Westenra family, Barons Rossmore.

The castle stood on the south-western edge of Monaghan town and was abandoned just after the Second World War. The ruins of the castle were blown up by Monaghan County Council in 1974.

=== Transport ===
The Ulster Canal through Monaghan, linking the River Blackwater at The Moy with Upper Lough Erne at Wattlebridge, was built between 1825 and 1842. By the time it was completed, competition in the form of the Ulster Railway from Belfast to Clones was already under construction. The canal was never a commercial success and was formally abandoned in 1931.

The Ulster Railway linked Monaghan with Armagh and Belfast in 1858 and with the Dundalk and Enniskillen Railway at Clones in 1863. It became part of the Great Northern Railway in 1876. The partition of Ireland in 1922 turned the boundary with County Armagh into an international frontier, after which trains were routinely delayed by customs inspections. In 1957 the Government of Northern Ireland made the GNR Board close the line between Portadown and the border, giving the GNRB no option but to withdraw passenger services between the border and Clones as well. CIÉ took over the remaining section of line between Clones, Monaghan and Glaslough in 1958 but withdrew goods services between Monaghan and Glaslough in 1959 and between Clones and Monaghan in 1960, leaving Monaghan with no railway service.

=== Twentieth century ===
In February 1919, the first self-consciously proclaimed soviet in the United Kingdom was established at Monaghan Lunatic Asylum. This led to the claim by Joseph Devlin in the House of Commons of the United Kingdom that "the only successfully conducted institutions in Ireland are the lunatic asylums".

On 17 May 1974 an Ulster loyalist car bomb exploded in the Friday evening rush hour, killing seven people. It was detonated outside Greacen's public house on North Road in a car that had been stolen earlier that afternoon in Portadown, County Armagh. The bomb killed Paddy Askin (44), Thomas Campbell (52), Thomas Croarkin (36), Archie Harper (73, died four days later), Jack Travers (28), Peggy White (45) and George Williamson (72). It also injured scores of civilians and caused extensive damage to the fabric of the town with North Road and Mill Street among the areas worst affected. This was one of the few car bombings in the Republic during The Troubles, which were centred on Northern Ireland; three other bombs exploded on the same day in Dublin in what became known as the Dublin and Monaghan bombings. The Ulster loyalist paramilitary group Ulster Volunteer Force (UVF) claimed responsibility in 1993.

A monument in memory of the victims was unveiled by Mary McAleese, 8th President of Ireland, on 17 May 2004, on the occasion of the 30th anniversary of the atrocity. The sandstone and metal column containing seven light wells bearing the names of each of the seven victims of the bombing was designed by Ciaran O'Cearnaigh and stands as a reminder of one of the darkest days in Ireland's modern history.

== Culture ==
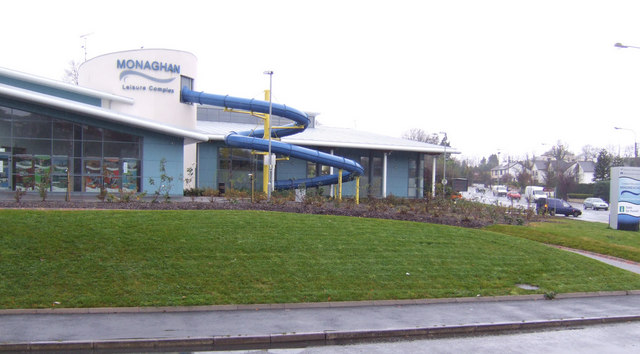
Monaghan Leisure Complex, built in 2005.

Monaghan continues to host one of Ireland's most prestigious and established blues festivals, the Harvest Time Blues Festival. It is hosted every September across Monaghan town.

The Fiddler of Oriel Muineachán Competition (also known as Féile Oriel) first held in 1969 returned in 2009 to celebrate its fortieth anniversary. It is held every May Bank Holiday weekend.

Founded in 1974, Monaghan County Museum is recognised as one of the leading provincial museums in Ireland, with a prestigious Council of Europe Award conferred in 1980, among others, to its credit. The museum is located in a mid-Victorian stone building of three stories, formerly two separate town houses, on Hill Street. It aims to acquaint its visitors with the history of County Monaghan and its people.

The Garage Theatre is an arts facility located on the Monaghan Education Campus. It hosts a wide range of activities including drama, music, dance and film.

The town is home to Monaghan United Football Club, formerly of the League of Ireland Premier Division.

== Local government ==
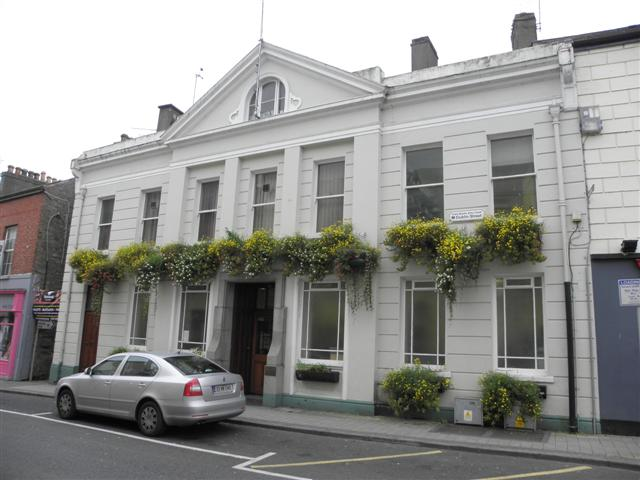
Monaghan Town Hall

Local issues are dealt with by the Monaghan Municipal Council which elects six members, all of which are elected as members of Monaghan County Council. The town forms part of the local electoral area of Monaghan for elections to Monaghan County Council and part of the Dáil constituency of Cavan–Monaghan. Monaghan Town Hall is a former bank branch dating from around 1880.

The largest party on the municipal council is Sinn Féin, which holds two of six seats. Fine Gael and Fianna Fáil each hold one seat and there are two independent members.

== Town layout and architecture ==
The centre of the town is made up of four interconnecting squares: Market Square (or Street), Church Square, The Diamond and Old Cross Square.

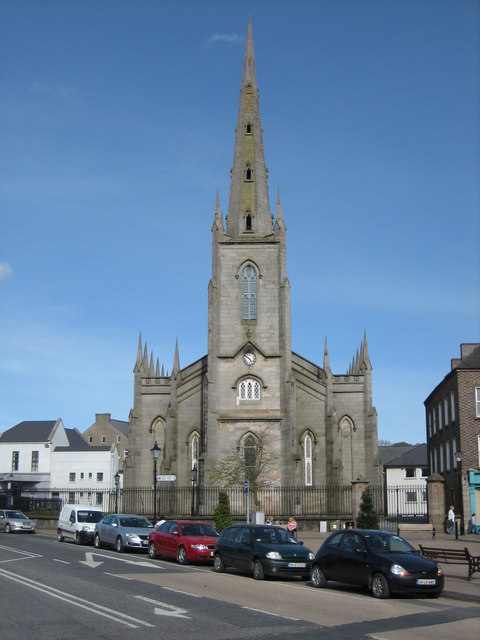
St. Patrick's Church of Ireland

Dating from the seventeenth century, the oldest remaining architectural feature in Monaghan town is the "Old Cross" – located in Old Cross Square. It is not fully agreed that it is in fact a cross, but may in fact have been a seventeenth-century sundial. It was originally located in the Diamond, the traditional centre of the town, and was used as a hiring cross and for the attaching of proclamations. It was moved to its present location in 1876 to allow for the construction of the Rossmore Memorial. Two landmark buildings remain from the eighteenth century, Aviemore House (built in 1760) on Mill Street and the "extremely elegant" Market House (from 1792) on Market Square.

Monaghan Courthouse on Church Square, designed by Joseph Welland and built in 1830, is an example of Victorian architecture. It features a sandstone facade of Doric columns supporting a pediment that bears the royal arms of the House of Hanover.

The Rossmore Memorial in The Diamond was built in 1876 as a memorial to Henry Westenra, 4th Baron Rossmore, who died in 1874. This Victorian monument, described by architectural historian C.E.B. Brett as "formidable and striking" is octagonal in shape, with central marble columns supporting a fountain. Around it, the eight grey columns support the pinnacled superstructure which rises to a dome. The dome is surmounted by a spire supported by yet more columns. The letters of Rossmore (also eight in number) are spaced out around the monument.

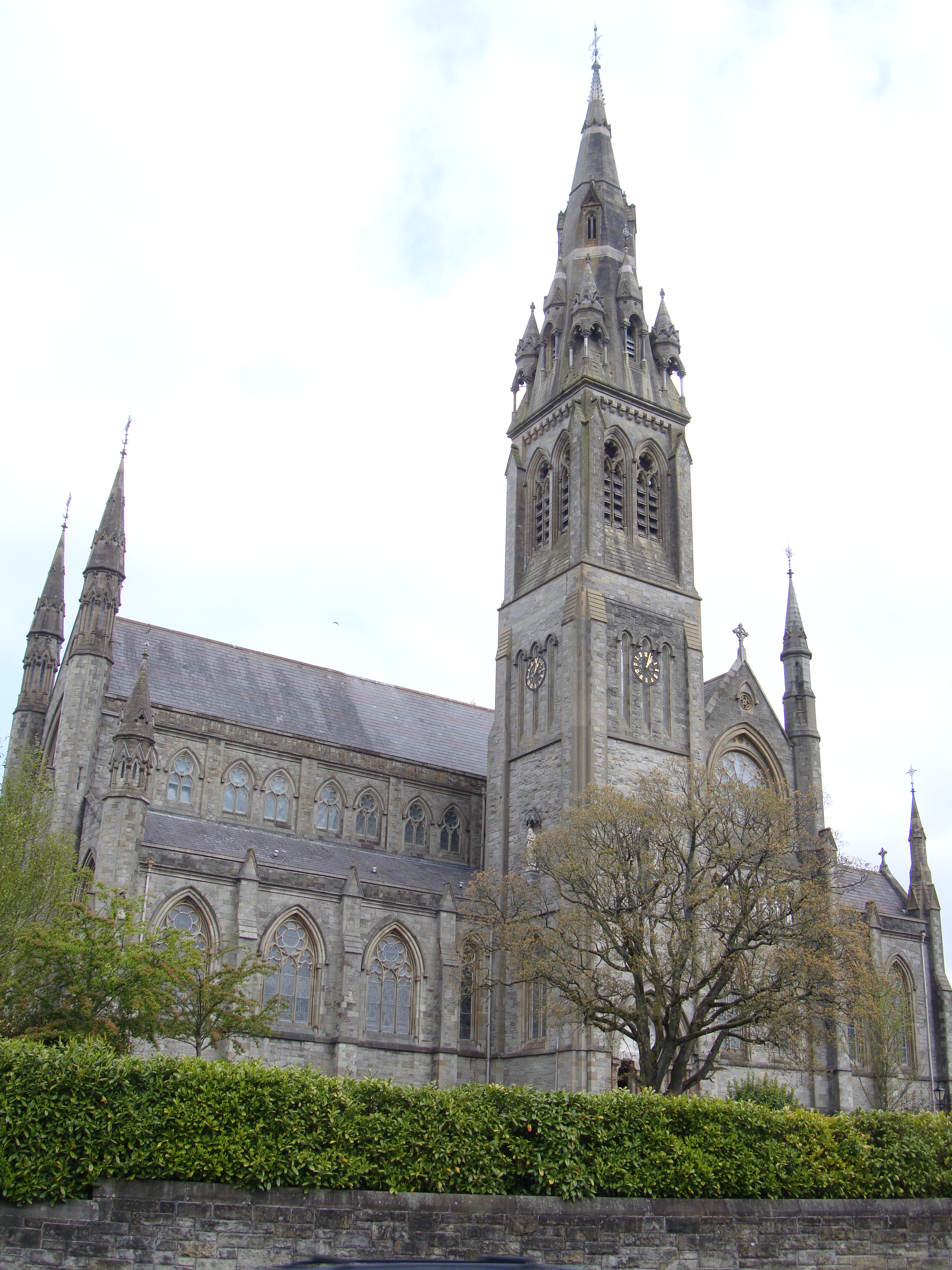
St. Macartan's Cathedral

The Gothic-Revival St Macartan's Cathedral by James Joseph McCarthy is recognised as being "one of McCarthy's best works: an excellent example of the High Victorian ecclesiastical style at its best, rich without ever being over-ornate". The building comprises a delicate rose window and an impressive soaring spire and took over thirty years to complete. Construction work began in 1861 and the cathedral was finally dedicated in 1892. Originally the nave was intended to be two bays longer but lack of funds meant that the design was cut back. The Cathedral sits on an imposing site overlooking the town. Occupying a similarly commanding site on the opposite side of the town is St Macartan's College for boys (from 1840), a 17-bay classical structure with a bell tower and private chapel, by the Newry-born architect Thomas Duff.

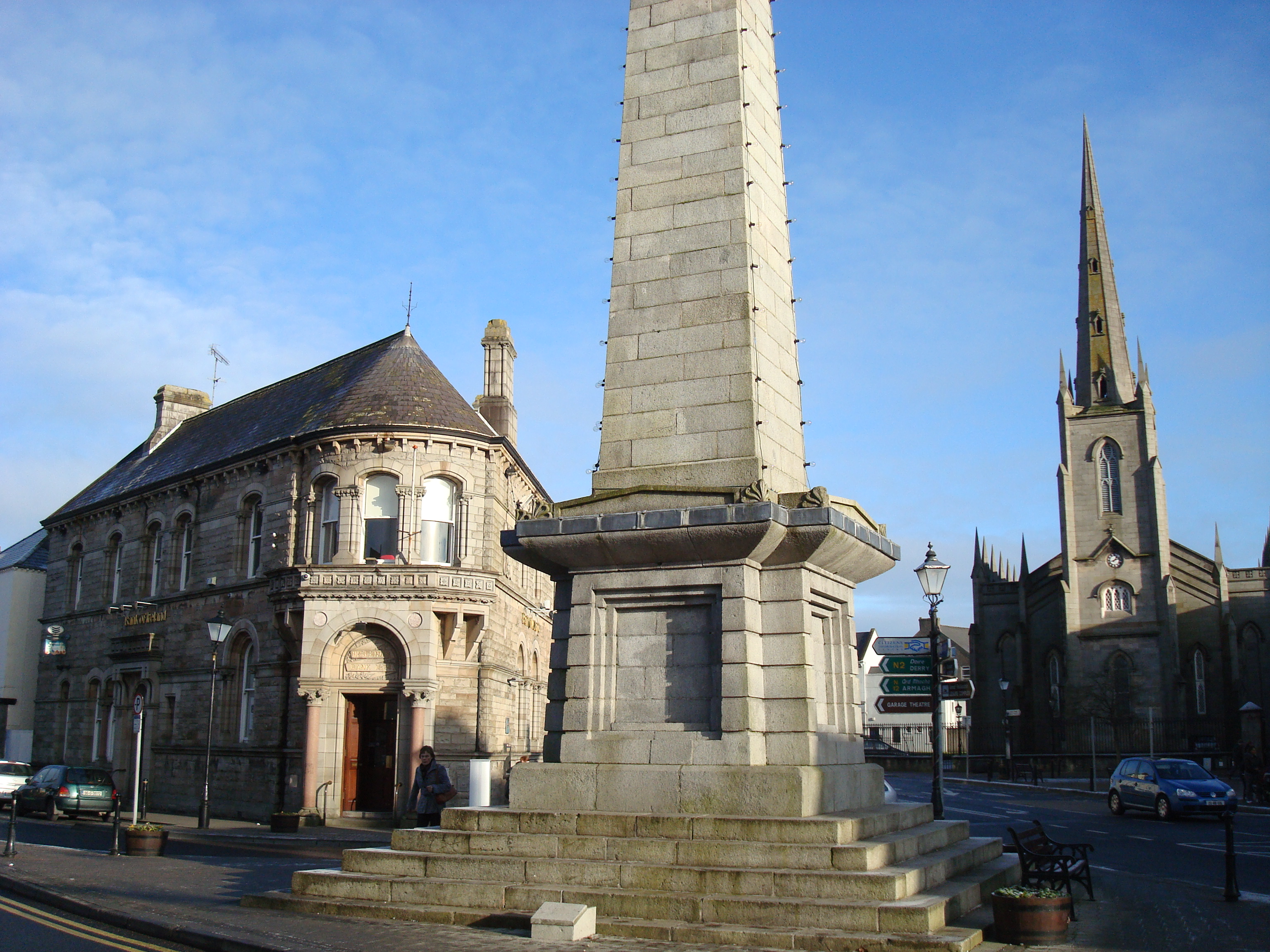
Church Square

Church Square features several examples of Victorian architecture, including the Ruskinian-Gothic style Bank of Ireland building, St. Patrick's Church of Ireland, and the Dawson Obelisk. Monaghan's Victorian architectural heritage also includes the former railway station, the Orange Hall on North Road and the Westenra Hotel on the Diamond.

== Economy ==
The town is a centre for the timber-frame house building industry with Kingspan Century being the largest of its kind in Europe. It is also the centre of a thriving agri business most notable of which is the mushroom industry. Engineering also features in the region with both Moffett and Combilift major participants in the materials handling market.

There is a campaign to boost tourism by reopening the Ulster Canal in a scheme which would eventually allow boats to travel from towns in Northern Ireland, such as Newry, by way of Monaghan to places as far south as Limerick, as well as Dublin.

Monaghan once had a thriving furniture manufacturing industry. Since 1990, this has diminished greatly under global competition. However, manufacturers such as Rossmore Furniture (which took its name from Rossmore Forest Park, situated just outside the town) continue to operate from the town.

== Education ==
The town has four primary schools:

- Gaelscoil Ultain
- Monaghan Model School
- St. Louis Girls' National School
- Scoil Mhuire Muineachan - St. Mary's Boys' School

There are five secondary schools in the area:

- St. Louis Secondary School
- St Macartan's College
- Monaghan Collegiate School
- Coláiste Oiriall
- Beech Hill College

== Transport ==
Public transport operator Bus Éireann routes 32 (Dublin/Letterkenny), 65 (Galway/Athlone/Monaghan), 162 (Monaghan/Dundalk), 175 (Monaghan/Cootehill/Cavan), 182 (Drogheda/Collon/Ardee/Monaghan) all serve the town.

Several TFI Local Link services also serve the town. These include routes M1 (Knockatallon to Monaghan Institute via Monaghan Town Centre), M2 (Ballybay – Monaghan Institute via Monaghan Hospital), M3 (Mullan Village to Latlorcan via Monaghan Town), and 176 (Cavan Town to Monaghan Town).

== Notable people ==
- Jonathan Douglas, footballer
- The Rt Hon. Sir Charles Gavan Duffy, politician and co-founder of The Nation, subsequently the eighth Premier of Victoria, was born at 10 Dublin Street.
- Jim Lynagh, Republican martyr who was a volunteer in the East Tyrone Brigade of the Provisional Irish Republican Army
- Juan MacKenna, hero of the Chilean War of Independence
- Caoimhghín Ó Caoláin, politician
- Mary Reid (1953–2003), activist, socialist and poet
- Nathaniel Walter Swan (1834–1884), Australian writer, was born in Monaghan.
- William Temple, recipient of the Victoria Cross
- Sir William Whitla, politician and physician
- Alexander Williams, artist

== Gallery ==
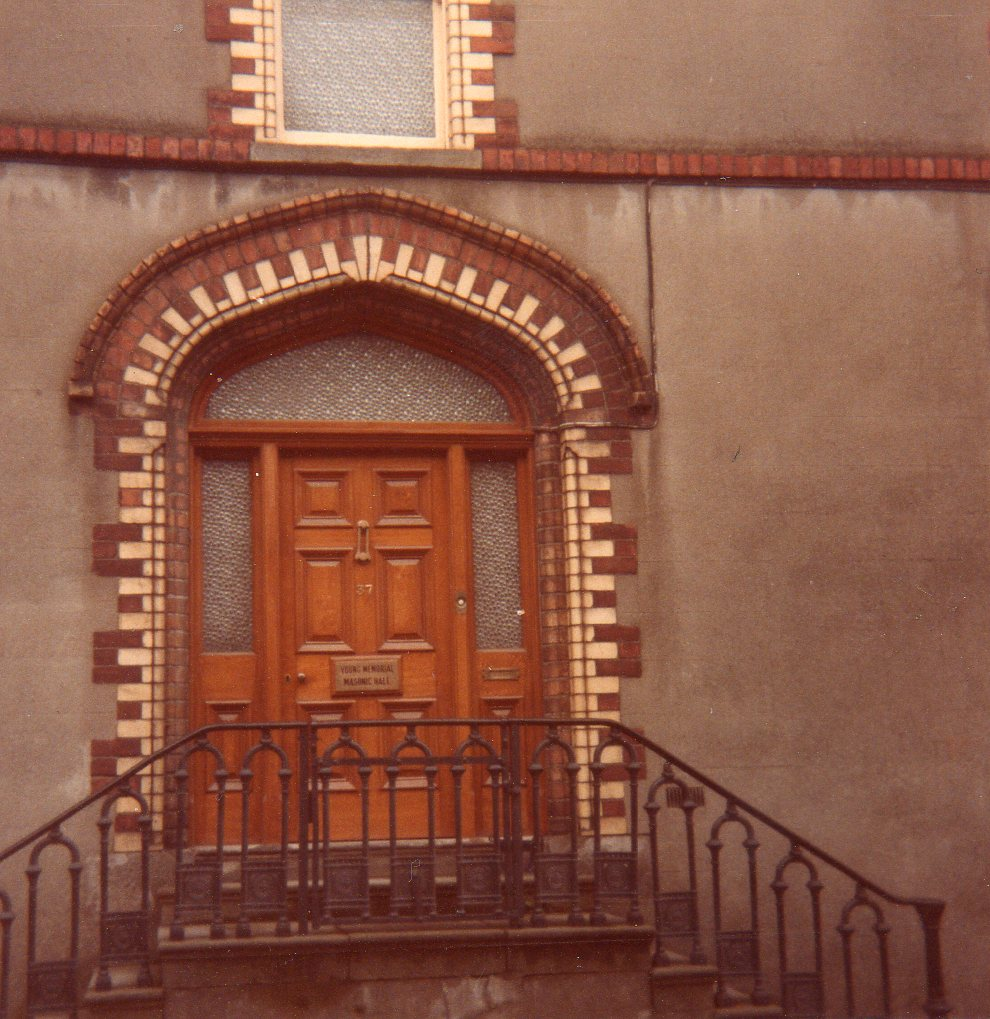
Entrance detail of Masonic Hall, 1989

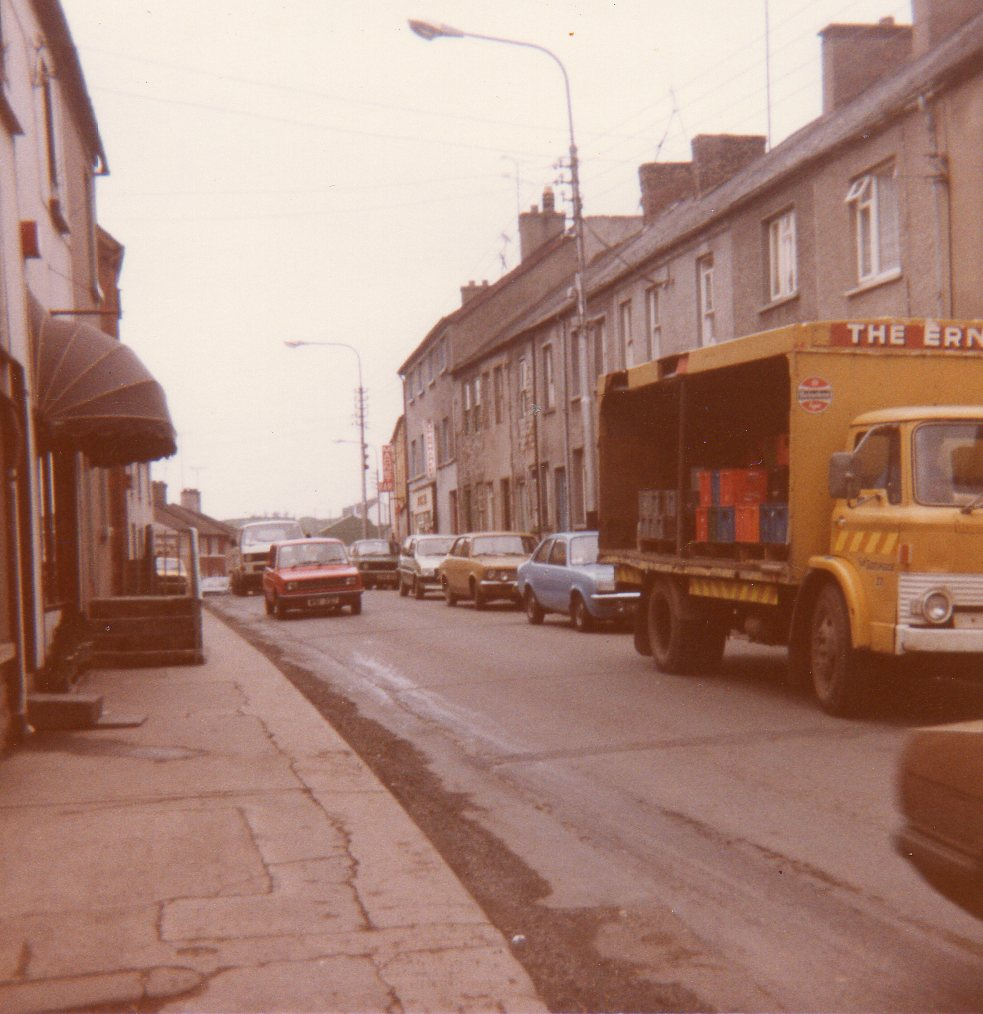
Glaslough Street, 1989, looking west

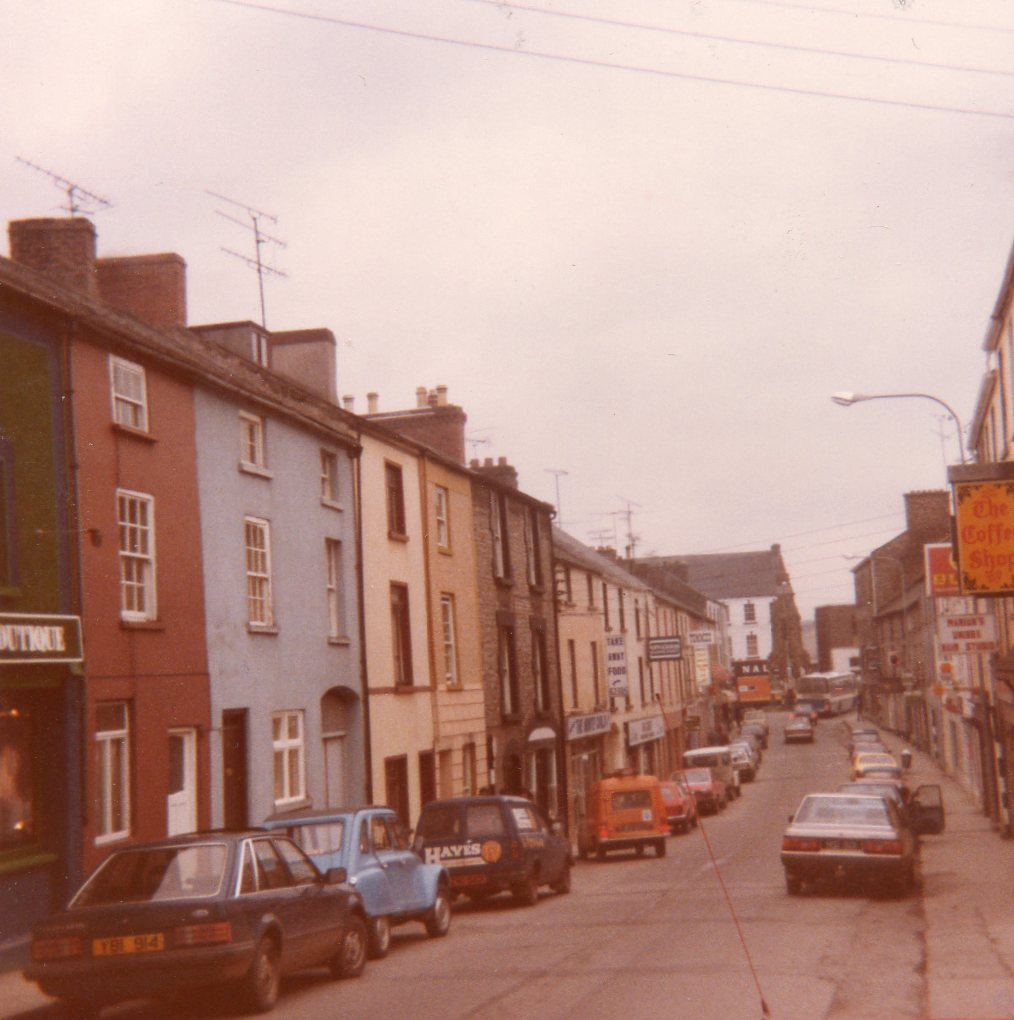
Glaslough Street, 1989, looking east

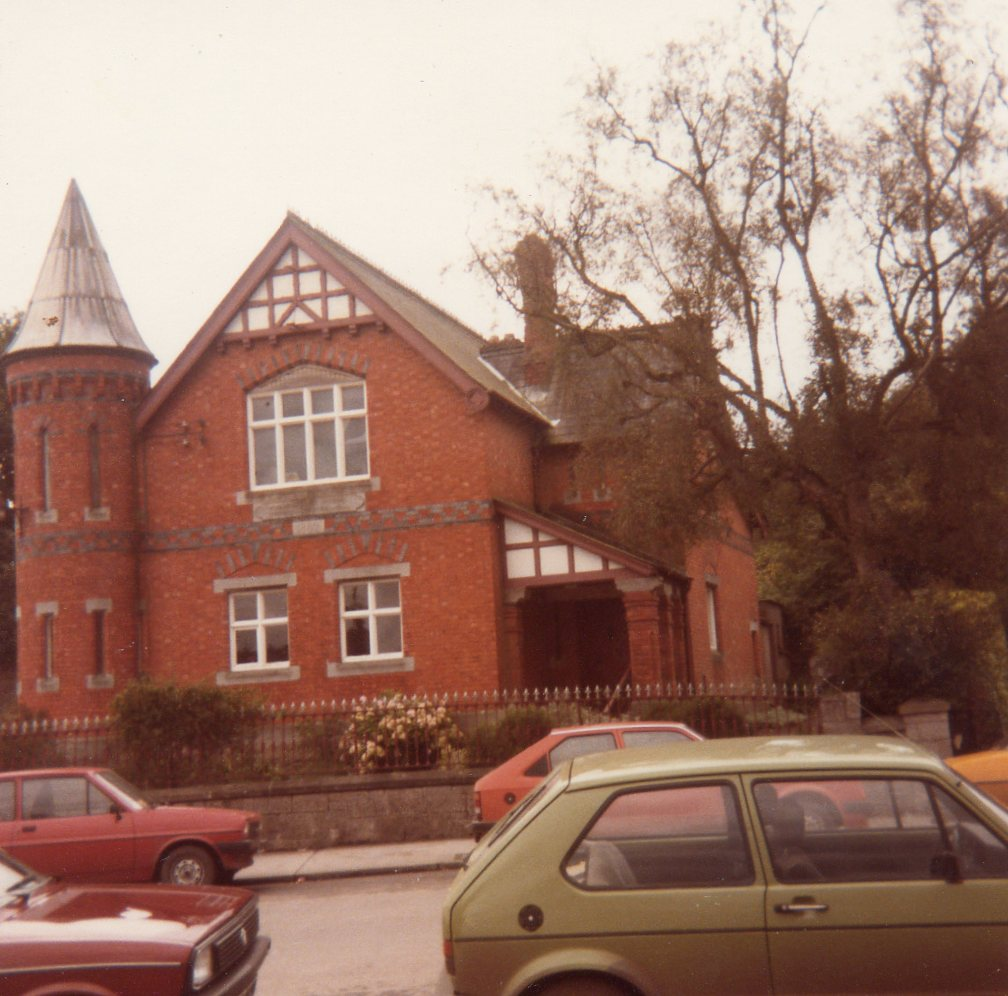
Orange Hall, North Road, 1989

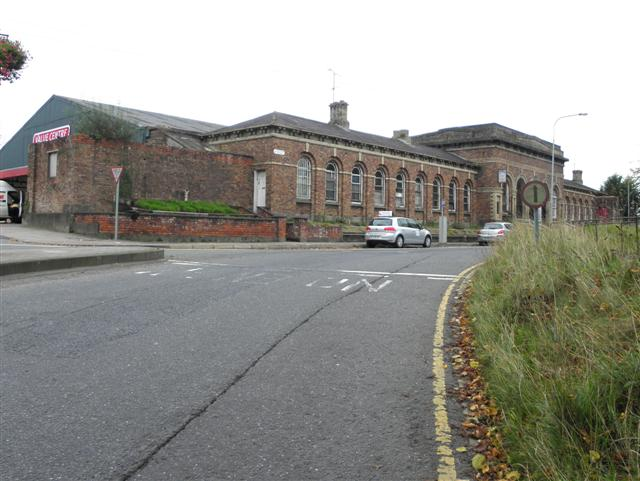
Monaghan railway station

== See also ==
- List of towns and villages in the Republic of Ireland
- Market Houses in the Republic of Ireland
- Monaghan United F.C., a local football team
