= Mary Reid (activist) =

Irish activist, socialist and poet

- Born: 25 April 1953; Monaghan, Ireland
- Died: 29 January 2003 (aged 49); Isle of Doagh, Ireland

Mary Reid (25 April 1953 – 29 January 2003) was an Irish activist, socialist and poet.

== Biography ==
Reid was born in Monaghan to Plunkett and Patricia Reid. Her parents ran a grocery shop in Pettigo, County Donegal. The shop was bombed in 1973 through a loyalist car bomb. The family were not killed. Reid was educated in St Louis convent secondary school in Monaghan before going on to study history and politics at University College Dublin. After graduating with an Arts degree, Reid went on to study law in Trinity College Dublin and later gained two master's degrees in rural development from University College Galway and creative writing from the University of Lancaster.

Reid spoke five languages, fluently in French and Irish and conversational German and Spanish. During her time in UCD, Reid got involved with the Official Irish Republican movement. Upon the group's split in 1974, Reid joined the Irish Republican Socialist Party and became their education officer in 1977. She edited The Starry Plough in 1978–9. Reid worked as a campaigner for the status of paramilitary prisoners and the elimination of the Special Criminal Court. She resigned from the journal in 1979, traveled to France on a false passport, and became a campaigner for political refugees in Paris.

She was arrested in 1982 with two other activists. Their Vincennes apartment supposedly contained guns and explosives connected through the Irish National Liberation Army to Palestinian terrorists wanted for bombing a Jewish deli shop on Rue des Rosiers. While the group did have connections to Palestinian groups, they did not have a connection to the splinter group that was responsible for the bombing. The group were sentenced to five years but were released after nine months when they were cleared after one of the gendarmes admitted to lying about the arrest and evidence. The three brought and won a lawsuit against the French state in 1989. In 1987, Reid returned to Ireland. Initially she moved to Louisburgh, County Mayo before becoming a lecturer in Women's Studies in the North West Institute of Further and Higher Education in Derry. She also taught English at a community resource center there.

As a poet, Reid wrote in both Irish and English. She had an interest in the history and folklore of Lough Derg, and in feminist spirituality. She underwent a number of pilgrimages. She was compiling a collection of poetry for publication with Cathal Ó'Searcaigh when she died.

== Personal life ==
She married Cathal Óg Goulding, the son of Official IRA chief of staff Cathal Goulding. In 1973, they had a son Cathal. During her period of arrest in France, Reid's nine-year-old son was placed in a French foster home until taken in by friends and by his grandmother. Her marriage did not last.

Her long-term partner was the academic and former IRSP activist Terry Robson from about 1989 to her death. Reid died in 2003; she drowned while walking her dogs at Lacacurry beach on the Isle of Doagh, County Donegal. There was some controversy as it was unclear if she died rescuing her dog or if there were suspicious circumstances around it. However, an investigation in 2005 concluded that her death was accidental.
