= Derrick Westenra, 5th Baron Rossmore =

Anglo-Irish noble, soldier, author and Orangeman

Derrick Warner William Westenra, 5th Baron Rossmore (7 February 1853, Dublin, County Dublin, Ireland – 31 January 1921, Rossmore Park, County Monaghan, Ireland), known as The Hon. Derrick Westenra until March 1874, was an Anglo-Irish noble, soldier, author and Orangeman.

== Biography ==
The second son of The 3rd Baron Rossmore and Josephine Julia Helen (née Lloyd), he was educated at Rugby. Commissioned a lieutenant in the Monaghan Militia, he resigned effective 4 December 1872, when he was made a sub-lieutenant in the 9th Lancers, replacing the controversial Sub-Lieutenant Tribe.

On 28 March 1874, upon the death of his elder brother Henry in a riding accident, Derrick succeeded as The 5th Baron Rossmore, of Monaghan in the County of Monaghan, in the Peerage of Ireland and as The 4th Baron Rossmore, of the County of Monaghan, in the Peerage of the United Kingdom. His brother had been an officer of the 1st Life Guards, and Derrick was transferred to that regiment to replace him, as a sub-lieutenant, on 10 June 1874. He resigned his commission on 23 October 1875.

Lord Rossmore was appointed Honorary Colonel of the 5th Battalion, Royal Irish Fusiliers (formerly the Monaghan Militia), on 29 July 1896. On 18 June 1897, he was appointed Lord Lieutenant of Monaghan, succeeding the late Earl of Dartrey, and held the office until his death. He wrote the book Things I Can Tell, published in 1912.

He was one of the first polo players in England, where he played in Richmond Park in London. Lord Rossmore was also a prominent member of the Orange Order.

== Family ==
He married Mittie Naylor on 14 June 1882 at All Saints' Church, Ennismore Gardens, London, England.

Children:

- Hon. Dame Mary Bailey (1 December 1890 – 29 July 1960)
- William Westenra, 6th Baron Rossmore (12 July 1892 – 17 October 1958)
- Hon. Richard Westenra (15 October 1893 – 26 July 1944)

== Sources ==
- Charles Mosley, editor, Burke's Peerage, Baronetage & Knightage, 107th edition, 3 volumes (Wilmington, Delaware, U.S.A.: Burke's Peerage (Genealogical Books) Ltd, 2003), volume 3, page 3409
- G.E. Cokayne; with Vicary Gibbs, H.A. Doubleday, Geoffrey H. White, Duncan Warrand and Lord Howard de Walden, editors, The Complete Peerage of England, Scotland, Ireland, Great Britain and the United Kingdom, Extant, Extinct or Dormant, new ed., 13 volumes in 14 (1910-1959; reprint in 6 volumes, Gloucester, U.K.: Alan Sutton Publishing, 2000), volume XI, page 183
- Mosley, ibid, volume 1, page 220

Honorary titles
Preceded by The Earl of Dartrey	Lord Lieutenant of Monaghan; 1897–1921	Succeeded by Sir John Leslie
Peerage of the United Kingdom
Preceded by Henry Westenra	Baron Rossmore; 1874–1921	Succeeded by William Westenra
Peerage of the United Kingdom
Preceded by Henry Westenra	Baron Rossmore; 1874–1921	Succeeded by William Westenra
