= William Davis =

William, Will, or Bill Davis may refer to:

== Academia ==
- William C. Davis (historian) (born 1946), American historian and university professor
- William H. Davis (educator) (1848–1938), American educator and school administrator
- William Hatcher Davis (1939–2017), professor of philosophy, Auburn University
- William Stearns Davis (1877–1930), American educator, historian, and writer
- William Watson Davis (1884–1960), professor and author

== Arts and entertainment ==
=== Film, television, and theater ===
- William B. Davis (born 1938), actor, professor, and waterskier
- Will S. Davis (1882–1920), American film director
- William Stanford Davis (born 1951), American actor
- Wee Willie Davis (William Grundy Davis, 1906–1981), American film actor and professional wrestler
- Bill C. Davis (1952–2021), American playwright and actor
- Robert Hartford-Davis (1923–1977), born William Henry Davis, British producer, director and writer

=== Music ===
- Bill Davis (musician), American guitarist, vocalist, and songwriter
- Wild Bill Davis (1918–1995), American jazz musician
- William "Bill" Davis, baritone, founding member of the 1950s R&B group The Crows
- Will Davis (musician) (1926–1984), jazz pianist

=== Other media ===
- William Davis (journalist) (1933–2019), economics editor, BBC presenter, editor of Punch, 1969–1977
- William Davis (artist) (1812–1873), Irish Pre-Raphaelite artist
- William Davis (photographer), American photographer
- William Moore Davis (1829–1920), American painter
- William Virgil Davis (born 1940), American poet
- Bill Davis (artist) (born 1949), American illustrator, animation director and designer, graphic designer, and painter

== Military ==
- William A. Davis Jr. (1927–2017), engineer for the US Army
- William Church Davis (1866–1958), U.S. Army general
- William G. M. Davis (1812–1898), Confederate States Army general
- William V. Davis (1902–1981), US Navy admiral
- William Davis (Royal Navy officer) (1901–1987), British admiral
- William Watts Hart Davis (1820–1910), brevetted brigadier general of the United States Volunteers during the American Civil War

== Politics ==
- Bill Davis (1929–2021), Canadian politician, premier of Ontario
- Will Davis (Illinois politician) (born 1968), Illinois State Representative for the 30th district
- Will Davis (Virginia politician), Virginia state legislator for the 39th district
- William B. Davis (politician) (died 1935), American politician from Maryland
- William C. Davis (American politician) (1867–1934), 11th lieutenant governor of Alabama
- William C. Davis (Canadian politician) (1939–2025)
- William E. Davis (1929–2021), university president, Democratic politician and football coach
- William Hammatt Davis (1879–1964), American politician
- William Henry Davis (1872–1951), appointed assistant to the Secretary of War, 1917
- William H. Davis (sheriff), Pittsburgh City Council member, 1952–1954; sheriff of Allegheny County, 1954–1970
- William H. Davis (Pennsylvania state representative), served 1854
- William H. Davis (Pennsylvania state senator) (1900–1955), served 1955
- William Lovel Davis (1844–1932), Australian politician
- William Morris Davis (politician) (1815–1891), U.S. representative from Pennsylvania
- William P. Davis (Illinois politician), member of the Illinois House of Representatives
- William Walter Davis (1840–1923), Australian politician
- William Z. Davis (1839–1923), Republican politician in Ohio, and Ohio Supreme Court judge
- William Howe Davis (1904–1982), American politician, mayor of Orange, New Jersey

== Science ==
- William Davis (cardiologist) (born 1957), American cardiologist and author of Wheat Belly
- William C. Davis Jr. (1921–2010), American ballistics engineer and writer
- William Conan Davis (1926–2022), African-American scientist
- William Morris Davis (1850–1934), American geographer, geologist and meteorologist
- William T. Davis (1862–1945), naturalist, entomologist and historian

== Sports ==
=== American football ===
- Bill Davis (offensive lineman) (1916–1994), tackle
- William C. Davis (American football) (1938–2020), coach
- Willie Davis (defensive end) (1934–2020)
- Willie Davis (wide receiver) (born 1967)
- Will Davis (linebacker) (born 1986), defensive end
- Will Davis (cornerback) (born 1990)
- Bill Davis (coach) (1941–2002)
- Billy Davis (wide receiver) (William Augusta Davis III, born 1972)
- Billy Davis (linebacker) (William Henry Davis Jr., born 1961)

=== Baseball ===
- William Davis (baseball), Negro league baseball player
- Willie Davis (baseball) (1940–2010), center fielder in Major League Baseball
- Will Davis (baseball) (born 1984), American college baseball coach
- Bill Davis (baseball) (1942–2023)
- Babe Davis (William L. Davis, fl.1937–1939), American baseball player

=== Basketball ===
- Will Davis (basketball) (born 1992), American basketball
- Willie Davis (basketball) (born 1945)
- Bill Davis (basketball) (1921–1975)

=== Rugby union ===
- Will Davis (rugby union) (born 1990), English rugby union player
- Bill Davis (rugby union) (born 1942), New Zealand rugby union and softball player
- Wendy Davis (rugby union) (William Edward Norman Davis, 1913–2002), international rugby union player for Wales

=== Other sports ===
- Bill Davis (darts player) (born 1959), American darts player
- Bill Davis (NASCAR owner) (1950/1951–2025), American motorsports car owner
- J. William Davis, father of the National Letter of Intent for college athletics
- William Davis (cricketer, born 1880) (1880–1959), who played for Surrey, London County and the South of England from 1903 to 1911
- Will Davis (cricketer) (born 1996), English cricketer
- William Davis (golfer) (1861–1902), Scottish golfer
- Bill Davis (ice hockey) (born 1954), Canadian ice hockey player

== Other people ==
- William Davis (miner) (1887–1925), miner killed during strike protest leading to Davis Day
- William Heath Davis (1822–1909), early settler of San Diego, California, US
- William John Davis (1848–1934), British trade unionist
- William Rhodes Davis (1889–1941), American oil man and Nazi collaborator
- William Davis (bishop) (1908–1987), Anglican bishop and archbishop in Canada
- William Davis (judge) (1954–2025), judge of the High Court of England and Wales
- William Davis (priest), English priest
- William George Davis (born 1984), American serial killer and former nurse
- W. Eugene Davis (born 1936), judge of the US Court of Appeals for the Fifth Circuit

== See also ==
- Billy Newton-Davis (born 1951), Canadian R&B, jazz and gospel singer-songwriter
- Billy Davis (disambiguation)
- William Davies (disambiguation)
