= William H. Davis =

William H. Davis may refer to:

- William Hammatt Davis (1879–1964), American lawyer and government official
- William Hatcher Davis (1939–2017), professor at Auburn University
- William Henry Davis (1872–1951), educator, pharmacist, and United States government official
- William H. Davis (educator) (1848–1938), American educator and school administrator
- William H. Davis (sheriff), sheriff of Allegheny County from 1954 to 1970
- William H. Davis (Pennsylvania state representative), in office 1854
- William H. Davis (Pennsylvania state senator) (1900–1955), in office 1955

== See also ==
- William Davis (disambiguation)
