= Sellick =

Sellick is a surname. Notable people with the surname include:

- Arthur Sellick (1878–1958), English cricketer
- Brian Arthur Sellick (1918–1996), British anesthesiologist
- John Sellick (1609–1690), English Anglican priest
- Luke Sellick (born 1990), Canadian jazz composer
- Phyllis Sellick (1911–2007), English classical pianist and educator
- Robin Sellick (born 1967), Australian photographer
