= Billy Davis =

Billy Davis may refer to:

- Billy Davis (songwriter) (1932–2004), American songwriter, record producer, and singer
- Billy Davis (guitarist) (born 1938), American guitarist, member of Hank Ballard & The Midnighters
- Billy Davis Jr. (born 1938), American singer, member of the group The 5th Dimension
- Billy Davis (American football coach) (born 1965), American football coach in the NFL
- Billy Davis (wide receiver) (born 1972), former professional American football player
- Billy Davis (linebacker) (born 1961), American football player
- Billy Davis (Mississippi politician) (born 1938), candidate for Vice President of the United States, 1984, with Lyndon LaRouche
- Billy Davis (Arizona politician) (born 1945), former Arizona State Senator

== See also ==
- Billy Davies (born 1964), Scottish football manager and former player
- Billie Davis, English singer
- William Davis (disambiguation)
