= Michael DeMond Davis =

American journalist (1939–2003)

Michael DeMond Davis (January 1939 – November 13, 2003), also known by the byline Mike Davis, was an American journalist and author. In 1963, he was hired as the first black reporter at the Atlanta Constitution. He co-authored Thurgood Marshall, Warrior at the Bar, Rebel at the Bench, a biography of the Supreme Court justice. His other works include Black American Women in Olympic Track and Field.

== Early life and education ==
One of four children of John P. Davis and Marguerite Davis (née DeMond), Michael D. Davis grew up in Washington, D.C., and New York City. His father, John P. Davis was a graduate of Harvard Law School and a prominent journalist and civil rights lawyer. His mother was a graduate of Syracuse University. Mike Davis was the grandson of Dr. William Henry Davis and the Reverend Abraham Lincoln DeMond

In 1943, the first lawsuit challenging segregated schools in Washington, D.C., was brought in Michael D. Davis's name by his father, John P. Davis. The Washington Star was highly critical of an African-American lawyer legally challenging the District's Dual school system when the principal of Noyes School refused to admit Mike Davis at five years of age, stating that the District citizens had long accepted separate schools for blacks and whites and that the suit brought by John P. Davis would cause even deeper divisions in the nation's capital.

The U.S. Congress, in response to John P. Davis's suit, appropriated federal funds to construct the Lucy D. Slowe elementary school directly across the street from his Brookland home in the neighborhood of Washington, D.C. Davis attended the Fieldston school in New York, New York.

As a student at Morehouse College in Atlanta, Georgia, and a member of the Southern Christian Leadership Conference (SCLC), he worked closely with Martin Luther King Jr., and was a leader of the student sit-in movement. He was arrested many times in Atlanta's bus stations and department stores.

== Journalism ==
Ralph McGill, publisher of the Atlanta Constitution, and Eugene Patterson hired Davis as the paper's first African-American reporter. McGill became his mentor and friend.

Davis went on to Vietnam as the Afro-American Newspapers war correspondent. During his 18 months in Vietnam, he reported on combat activities of black service people in the Afro's 13-state circulation area. When he returned home, he joined the Baltimore Sun. He was a staff member of the San Diego Union, where he covered Governor Jerry Brown, the now-defunct Washington Star, an editor of NBC television news in Washington, D.C., and a reporter for the Washington Times.

His work has received several Front Page Awards from the American Newspaper Guild. The NAACP gave him an award for his coverage of Vietnam.

=== Vietnam Foreign News Correspondent ===
From July to November 1967, Davis published over 100 articles as the Vietnam War correspondent for the Baltimore Afro-American in the column called the "Vietnam Notebook".

== Selected articles ==
- "On the Battlefields of Vietnam, 'They couldn't care less what color you are," Baltimore Afro-American, July 22, 1967.
- "Major Brown Says: 'Your decisions have to be right," Baltimore Afro-American, August 5, 1967.
- "Wounded Veterans Describe Horror of Vietnam," Baltimore Afro-American, July 1, 1967.
- "In the Face of Death, They Laugh: Mud erases color in jungle Viet 'front,'" Baltimore Afro-American, October 7, 1967
- "Young talks of rights and peace," Baltimore Afro-American, September 16, 1967.
- "Wait until these GIs come home," Baltimore Afro-American, August 12, 1967.
- "The Other War," Baltimore Afro-American, November 5, 1967.
- "3 Dead, 50 Shot on S.C. Campus," Baltimore Afro-American, February 10, 1967.
- "Memo From Vietnam: 'I'm a lot safer over here than in the states,'" Baltimore Afro-American, August 5, 1967.
- "Few Colored Officers in Command", Baltimore Afro-American, June 3, 1967.
- "Davis to Tell AFRO Readers of the Role of Our Men in Vietnam", Baltimore Afro-American, June 24, 1967.
- "Your Decisions Have to Be Right," Baltimore Afro-American, August 4, 1967.
- "Vietnam Notebook", Baltimore Afro-American, August 5, 1967.
- "He Works With People in Vietnam", Baltimore Afro-American, September 9, 1967.
- "20 Minutes to Save three Lives", Baltimore Afro-American, October 14, 1967.
- "We Walked into an Ambush," Baltimore Afro-American, August 12, 1967.
- "GIs shocked by U.S. Riots," Baltimore Afro-American, August 12, 1967.
- "Mud Erases Color in Jungle of Viet Front," Baltimore Afro-American, October 7, 1967.
- "Togetherness is Key as men of the 173rd Fight to Stay Alive," Baltimore Afro-American, November 11, 1967.
- "Wait Till These GIs Come Home," Baltimore Afro-American, August 12, 1967
- " Mike Davis tells forum Viet GIs expect rights," Baltimore Afro-American, February 3, 1968.

== Bibliography ==
=== Contemporary newspapers and journals ===
- Baltimore Afro-American, 1966–1969
- Ebony, 1967
- Jet, 1965

=== Books ===
- Carson, Clayborne, David J. Garrow, Gerlad Gill, Vincent Harding, and Darlene Clark Hine, eds, The Eyes on the Prize Civil Rights Reader: Documents, Speeches, and * Firsthand Accounts from the Black Freedom Struggle, New York: Penguin Books, 1991.
- Davis, Michael D. Black American Women in Olympic Track and Field, McFarland, 1992.
- Davis Michael D., and Hunter R. Clark. Thurgood Marshall: Warrior at the Bar, Rebel on the Bench. New York: Birch Lane Press, 1992.
- Farrar, Hayward. The Baltimore Afro-American: 1892-1950. Westport: Greenwood Press, 1998.
- Graham, Herman III. The Brother's Vietnam War: Black Power, Manhood, and the Military Experience. Gainesville: University Press of Florida, 2003.
- Hall, Simon. Peace and Freedom: The Civil Rights and Antiwar Movements in the 1960s. Philadelphia: University of Pennsylvania Press, 2005.
- Jeffries, Hasan Kwame. Bloody Lowndes: Civil Rights and Black Power in Alabama's Black Belt. New York: New York University Press, 2009.
- Raines, Howell. My Soul is Rested: The Story of the Civil Rights Movement in the Deep South. New York: Penguin Books, 1983.
- Sugrue, Thomas J. Sweet Land of Liberty: The Forgotten Struggle for Civil Rights in the North. New York: Random House, 2008.
- Terry, Wallace. Bloods: An Oral History of the Vietnam War by Black Veterans. Random House: New York, 1984.
- Washington, James Melvin, ed. A Testament of Hope: The Essential Writings of Martin Luther King, Jr. San Francisco: Harper & Row, 1986.
- Westheider, James. Fighting on Two Fronts: African Americans and the Vietnam War. New York: New York University Press, 1997.
- Wyatt, Clarence. Paper Soldiers: The American Press and the Vietnam War. New York: W.W. Norton & Company, 1993.
- Broussard, Jinx. African American Foreign Correspondents: A History (Media and Public Affairs). Louisiana State University Press, June 2013.
