= William Hunt (priest, born c. 1669) =

- Born: c. 1669
- Died: c. 1733

William Hunt (c. 1669 – c. 1733) was the Archdeacon of Bath from 31 December 1711 until his death.

== Education ==
Hunt was educated at John Roysse's Free School in Abingdon (now Abingdon School), and was later scholar and fellow of Pembroke College, Oxford.

== Career ==
He was Canon of Wells and Archdeacon of Bath from 1711 to 1733.

Church of England titles
Preceded by William Clement	Archdeacon of Bath; 1711–1733	Succeeded by Lawson Huddleston

== See also ==
- List of Old Abingdonians
