= Edwin Cook =

Edwin Arthur Cook (9 July 1888 – 15 September 1972) was Archdeacon of Bath from 1947 to 1962.

Memorial at Bath Abbey

Cook was educated at Maidstone Grammar School, Queens' College, Cambridge and Ridley Hall, Cambridge. After a curacy at Holy Trinity, Margate he was a CMS Missionary in Western China until 1926. After that he held incumbencies in Dover, Margate and Folkestone. He was Rector of Bath Abbey from 1947 to 1960.

== Notes ==
Church of England titles
Preceded by William Selwyn	Archdeacon of Bath; 1947–1962	Succeeded by Arthur Hopley
