= 1984 United States presidential election in Washington (state) =

- November 6, 1984

Nominee	Ronald Reagan	Walter Mondale
Party	Republican	Democratic
Home state	California	Minnesota
Running mate	George H. W. Bush	Geraldine Ferraro
Electoral vote	10	0
Popular vote	1,051,670	807,352
Percentage	55.82%	42.86%
County results
Reagan
50–60%
60–70%
70–80%
Mondale
40–50%
50–60%
President before election
Ronald Reagan
Republican
Elected President
Ronald Reagan
Republican

The 1984 United States presidential election in Washington took place on November 6, 1984. All 50 states and the District of Columbia, were part of the 1984 United States presidential election. Voters chose ten electors to the Electoral College, which selected the president and vice president of the United States.

The State of Washington was won by incumbent United States President Ronald Reagan of California, who was running against former Vice President Walter Mondale of Minnesota. Reagan ran for a second time with incumbent Vice President and former C.I.A. Director George H. W. Bush of Texas, and Mondale ran with Representative Geraldine Ferraro of New York, the first major female candidate for the vice presidency.

Nearly all counties in Washington voted for Reagan, save a handful of counties along the southern Pacific coast of the state, which voted for Mondale. As of the 2024 presidential election, this is the last time Washington has voted for a Republican in a presidential election, as well as the last time that King, Pierce, Thurston, and San Juan counties voted Republican.

One of the electors, Fred Nimmo, was unable to attend the meeting and was replaced by Bob Bristow. The other electors were Luci Bristow, Ben Bettridge, Art Statt, Don Watts, Doris Sorensen, Rich Evans, Betty Jo Cook, Harold Reynolds, and Phil Hemenway. Bettridge was chair of the electors.

== Results ==
1984 United States presidential election in Washington
Party	Candidate	Votes	%	±%
Republican	Ronald Reagan George H. W. Bush	1,051,670	55.82%	+6.16%
Democratic	Walter Mondale Geraldine Ferraro	807,352	42.86%	+5.54%
Libertarian	David Bergland Jim Lewis	8,844	0.47%	−1.21%
Populist	Bob Richards Maureen Salaman	5,724	0.30%	N/A
Independent	Lyndon LaRouche Jimmy Davis	4,712	0.25%	N/A
Citizens	Sonia Johnson Richard Walton	1,891	0.10%	−0.44%
New Alliance	Dennis Serrette Nancy Ross	1,654	0.09%	N/A
Communist	Gus Hall Angela Davis	814	0.04%	−0.01%
Workers World	Larry Holmes Gloria La Riva	641	0.03%	+0.01%
Socialist Workers	Melvin Mason Matilde Zimmermann	608	0.03%	−0.04%
Total votes		1,883,910	100.00%	N/A

=== By county ===
County	Ronald Reagan Republican		Walter Mondale Democratic		Other candidates Various parties		Margin		Total votes cast
County	#	%	#	%	#	%	#	%	Total votes cast
Adams	3,449	71.72%	1,311	27.26%	49	1.02%	2,138	44.46%	4,809
Asotin	3,876	55.21%	3,042	43.33%	103	1.47%	834	11.88%	7,021
Benton	32,307	69.28%	13,784	29.56%	540	1.16%	18,523	39.72%	46,631
Chelan	13,667	65.10%	6,978	33.24%	349	1.66%	6,689	31.86%	20,994
Clallam	13,605	57.32%	9,701	40.87%	429	1.81%	3,904	16.45%	23,735
Clark	40,681	52.86%	35,248	45.80%	1,028	1.34%	5,433	7.06%	76,957
Columbia	1,404	67.02%	673	32.12%	18	0.86%	731	34.89%	2,095
Cowlitz	14,858	47.98%	15,361	49.60%	749	2.42%	-503	-1.62%	30,968
Douglas	6,443	66.44%	3,127	32.24%	128	1.32%	3,316	34.19%	9,698
Ferry	1,232	55.75%	935	42.31%	43	1.95%	297	13.44%	2,210
Franklin	7,724	62.96%	4,328	35.28%	216	1.76%	3,396	27.68%	12,268
Garfield	913	63.94%	493	34.52%	22	1.54%	420	29.41%	1,428
Grant	12,888	65.81%	6,298	32.16%	398	2.03%	6,590	33.65%	19,584
Grays Harbor	11,286	43.96%	14,050	54.73%	335	1.30%	-2,764	-10.77%	25,671
Island	13,548	65.72%	6,850	33.23%	218	1.06%	6,698	32.49%	20,616
Jefferson	4,543	48.67%	4,602	49.30%	189	2.02%	-59	-0.63%	9,334
King	332,987	52.09%	298,620	46.71%	7,654	1.20%	34,367	5.38%	639,261
Kitsap	36,101	54.11%	29,681	44.49%	931	1.40%	6,420	9.62%	66,713
Kittitas	6,580	57.06%	4,830	41.89%	121	1.05%	1,750	15.18%	11,531
Klickitat	3,910	57.87%	2,712	40.14%	135	2.00%	1,198	17.73%	6,757
Lewis	15,846	66.22%	7,634	31.90%	451	1.88%	8,212	34.32%	23,931
Lincoln	3,474	66.90%	1,671	32.18%	48	0.92%	1,803	34.72%	5,193
Mason	8,410	53.74%	7,007	44.77%	233	1.49%	1,403	8.96%	15,650
Okanogan	7,476	57.25%	5,330	40.81%	253	1.94%	2,146	16.43%	13,059
Pacific	3,613	42.90%	4,679	55.56%	129	1.53%	-1,066	-12.66%	8,421
Pend Oreille	2,374	58.26%	1,655	40.61%	46	1.13%	719	17.64%	4,075
Pierce	112,877	57.85%	79,498	40.75%	2,733	1.40%	33,379	17.11%	195,108
San Juan	2,900	52.48%	2,514	45.49%	112	2.03%	386	6.99%	5,526
Skagit	18,840	56.53%	13,947	41.85%	539	1.62%	4,893	14.68%	33,326
Skamania	1,736	51.99%	1,552	46.48%	51	1.53%	184	5.51%	3,339
Snohomish	90,362	56.83%	66,728	41.97%	1,905	1.20%	23,634	14.86%	158,995
Spokane	88,043	58.96%	59,620	39.92%	1,673	1.12%	28,423	19.03%	149,336
Stevens	8,211	64.29%	4,304	33.70%	256	2.00%	3,907	30.59%	12,771
Thurston	34,442	55.51%	26,840	43.26%	763	1.23%	7,602	12.25%	62,045
Wahkiakum	776	44.62%	930	53.48%	33	1.90%	-154	-8.86%	1,739
Walla Walla	12,361	63.72%	6,804	35.08%	233	1.20%	5,557	28.65%	19,398
Whatcom	27,228	53.72%	22,670	44.73%	788	1.55%	4,558	8.99%	50,686
Whitman	10,021	59.48%	6,621	39.30%	207	1.23%	3,400	20.18%	16,849
Yakima	40,678	61.46%	24,724	37.36%	780	1.18%	15,954	24.11%	66,182
Totals	1,051,670	55.82%	807,352	42.86%	24,888	1.32%	244,318	12.97%	1,883,910

==== Counties that flipped from Republican to Democratic ====
- Cowlitz
- Jefferson
- Wahkiakum

=== By congressional district ===
Reagan won 7 of 8 congressional districts, 4 of which elected democrats.

District	Reagan	Mondale	Representative
1st	57%	43%	Joel Pritchard
1st	57%	43%	John Miller
2nd	56%	44%	Al Swift
3rd	54%	46%	Don Bonker
4th	64%	36%	Sid Morrison
5th	61%	39%	Tom Foley
6th	58%	42%	Norm Dicks
7th	42%	58%	Mike Lowry
8th	63%	37%	Rod Chandler

== See also ==
- United States presidential elections in Washington (state)
- Presidency of Ronald Reagan
