= 1992 United States presidential election in Indiana =

- November 3, 1992
- Turnout: 63.0% ▲2.6 pp
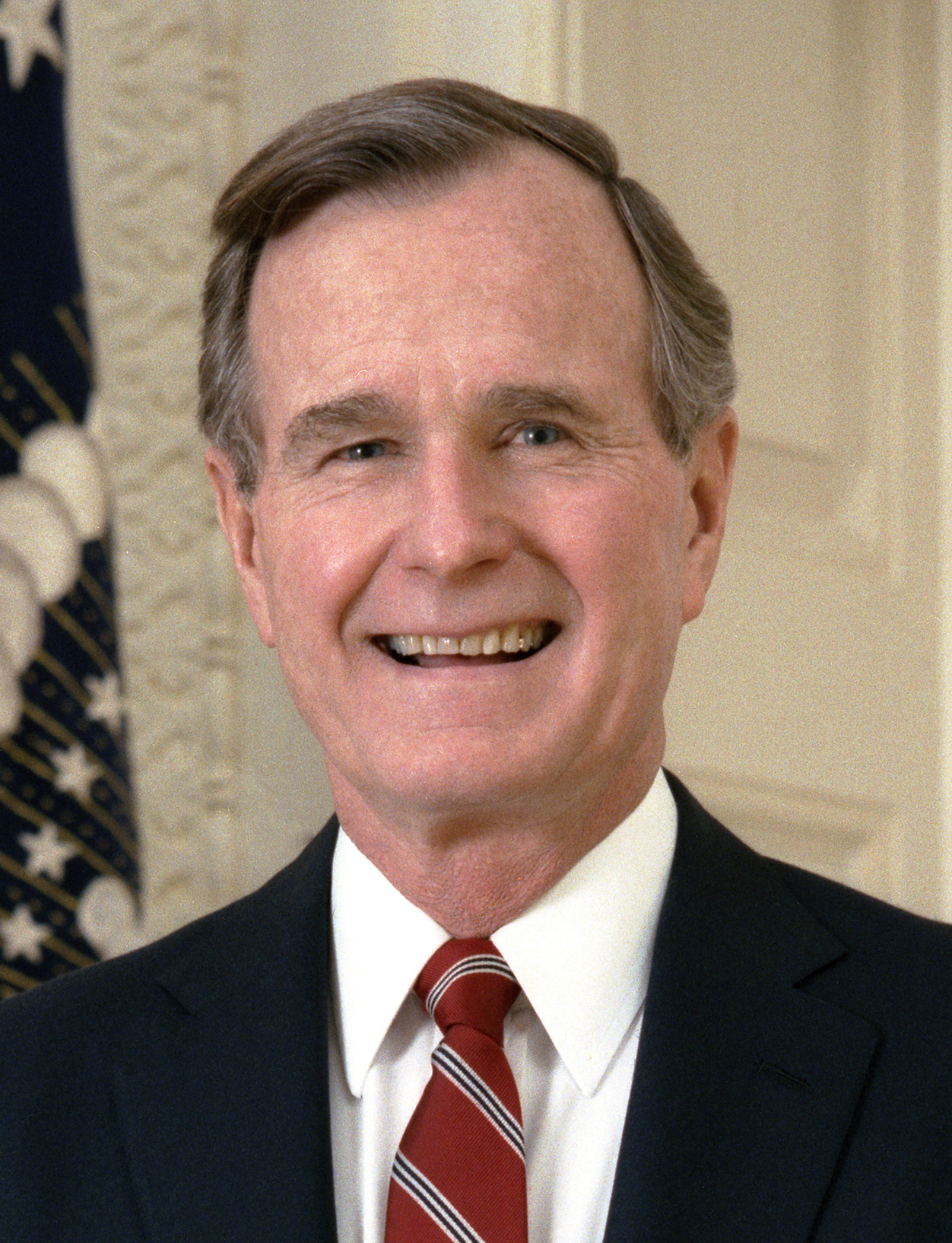

Nominee	George H. W. Bush	Bill Clinton	Ross Perot
Party	Republican	Democratic	Independent
Home state	Texas	Arkansas	Texas
Running mate	Dan Quayle	Al Gore	James Stockdale
Electoral vote	12	0	0
Popular vote	989,375	848,420	455,934
Percentage	42.91%	36.79%	19.77%
County results
Bush
30–40%
40–50%
50–60%
60–70%
Clinton
30–40%
40–50%
50–60%
President before election
George H. W. Bush
Republican
Elected President
Bill Clinton
Democratic

A presidential election was held in Indiana on November 3, 1992, as part of the 1992 United States presidential election. The Republican ticket of the incumbent president of the United States George H. W. Bush and the vice president of the United States Dan Quayle defeated the Democratic ticket of the governor of Arkansas Bill Clinton and the junior U.S. senator from Tennessee Al Gore. The independent ticket of the businessman Ross Perot and the former president of the Naval War College James Stockdale finished third. Clinton defeated Bush and Perot in the national election with 370 electoral votes.

== Primary elections ==
=== Republican Party ===
Indiana Republican primary, May 5, 1992
Party	Candidate	Votes	%
Republican	George H. W. Bush	374,666	80.12
Republican	Pat Buchanan	92,949	19.88
Total votes		467,615	100.00

=== Democratic Party ===
Indiana Democratic primary, May 5, 1992
Party	Candidate	Votes	%
Democratic	Bill Clinton	301,905	63.31
Democratic	Jerry Brown	102,379	21.47
Democratic	Paul Tsongas (withdrawn)	58,215	12.21
Democratic	Bob Kerrey (withdrawn)	14,350	3.01
Total votes		476,849	100.00

== General election ==
=== Statistics ===
As of 2024, this is the most recent presidential election in which the Democratic ticket carried Greene, Harrison, and Washington counties.

=== Results ===
1992 United States presidential election in Indiana
Party	Candidate	Votes	%	±%
Republican	George H. W. Bush Dan Quayle	989,375	42.91	▼16.93
Democratic	Bill Clinton Al Gore	848,420	36.79	▼2.90
Independent	Ross Perot James Stockdale	455,934	19.77	▲19.77
Libertarian	Andre Marrou Nancy Lord	7,936	0.34	▲0.34
New Alliance	Lenora Fulani Maria Elizabeth Munoz	2,583	0.11	▼0.36
Populist	Bo Gritz (write-in) Cyril "Cy" Minett (write-in)	1,467	0.06	▲0.06
Natural Law	John Hagelin (write-in) Mike Tompkins (write-in)	126	0.01	▲0.01
Socialist	J. Quinn Brisben (write-in) Barbara Garson (write-in)	16	0.00	▲0.00
National Economic Recovery	Lyndon LaRouche (write-in) N/A (Note: LaRouche had no registered running mate in Indiana.)	14	0.00	▲0.00
Total votes		2,321,133	100.00	

=== Results by county ===
1992 United States presidential election in Indiana by county
County	George H. W. Bush Republican		Bill Clinton Democratic		Ross Perot Independent		Others		Margin (Note: Except where noted, the margin is the difference of Bush's total minus Clinton's total.)		Total
County	Votes	%	Votes	%	Votes	%	Votes	%	Votes	%	Total
Adams	6,078	47.83%	3,708	29.18%	2,865	22.54%	57	0.45%	2,370	18.65%	12,708
Allen	55,003	45.24%	39,629	32.60%	25,809	21.23%	1,136	0.93%	15,374	12.64%	121,577
Bartholomew	13,146	47.91%	8,284	30.19%	5,882	21.44%	128	0.47%	4,862	17.72%	27,440
Benton	2,030	46.96%	1,221	28.24%	1,056	24.43%	16	0.37%	809	18.72%	4,323
Blackford	2,347	40.62%	2,088	36.14%	1,319	22.83%	24	0.42%	259	4.48%	5,778
Boone	9,485	54.64%	3,982	22.94%	3,826	22.04%	65	0.37%	5,503	31.70%	17,358
Brown	2,633	41.63%	2,029	32.08%	1,635	25.85%	28	0.44%	604	9.55%	6,325
Carroll	3,800	44.38%	2,561	29.91%	2,173	25.38%	28	0.33%	1,239	14.47%	8,562
Cass	7,421	45.70%	4,757	29.30%	3,944	24.29%	115	0.71%	2,664	16.40%	16,237
Clark	13,333	36.34%	17,460	47.58%	5,653	15.41%	248	0.68%	-4,127	-11.24%	36,694
Clay	4,696	46.20%	3,306	32.53%	2,134	21.00%	28	0.28%	1,390	13.67%	10,164
Clinton	6,141	50.24%	3,490	28.55%	2,535	20.74%	58	0.47%	2,651	21.69%	12,224
Crawford	1,903	38.11%	2,260	45.25%	819	16.40%	12	0.24%	-357	-7.14%	4,994
Daviess	5,591	53.15%	3,201	30.43%	1,695	16.11%	33	0.31%	2,390	22.72%	10,520
Dearborn	6,974	44.80%	5,116	32.86%	3,384	21.74%	93	0.60%	1,858	11.94%	15,567
Decatur	5,195	50.48%	2,774	26.96%	2,299	22.34%	23	0.22%	2,421	23.52%	10,291
DeKalb	6,682	44.48%	4,652	30.97%	3,554	23.66%	134	0.89%	2,030	13.51%	15,022
Delaware	20,473	40.36%	19,556	38.56%	10,453	20.61%	239	0.47%	917	1.80%	50,721
Dubois	6,785	42.44%	5,878	36.76%	3,195	19.98%	131	0.82%	907	5.68%	15,989
Elkhart	27,920	53.50%	14,660	28.09%	9,450	18.11%	154	0.30%	13,260	25.41%	52,184
Fayette	4,376	40.86%	3,969	37.06%	2,299	21.47%	66	0.62%	407	3.80%	10,710
Floyd	11,932	40.24%	13,166	44.40%	4,421	14.91%	132	0.45%	-1,234	-4.16%	29,651
Fountain	3,391	40.32%	2,829	33.64%	2,162	25.71%	28	0.33%	562	6.68%	8,410
Franklin	3,831	46.91%	2,456	30.07%	1,858	22.75%	22	0.27%	1,375	16.84%	8,167
Fulton	3,982	46.70%	2,552	29.93%	1,963	23.02%	30	0.35%	1,430	16.77%	8,527
Gibson	5,172	34.95%	6,909	46.68%	2,680	18.11%	39	0.26%	-1,737	-11.73%	14,800
Grant	13,806	48.04%	9,211	32.05%	5,597	19.48%	124	0.43%	4,595	15.99%	28,738
Greene	5,410	39.76%	5,431	39.91%	2,610	19.18%	157	1.15%	-21	-0.15%	13,608
Hamilton	34,622	62.46%	10,215	18.43%	10,365	18.70%	232	0.42%	24,257 (Note: In this county, where Perot ran second ahead of Clinton, the margin is the difference of Bush's total minus Perot's total.)	43.76%	55,434
Hancock	11,072	53.65%	4,752	23.02%	4,752	23.02%	63	0.31%	6,320	30.63%	20,639
Harrison	5,403	39.52%	5,768	42.19%	2,469	18.06%	31	0.23%	-365	-2.67%	13,671
Hendricks	18,373	55.45%	7,071	21.34%	7,519	22.69%	173	0.52%	10,854	32.76%	33,136
Henry	8,720	43.62%	6,794	33.99%	4,416	22.09%	59	0.30%	1,926	9.63%	19,989
Howard	15,306	44.57%	10,288	29.96%	8,575	24.97%	171	0.50%	5,018	14.61%	34,340
Huntington	9,093	56.79%	3,855	24.07%	2,967	18.53%	98	0.61%	5,238	32.72%	16,013
Jackson	7,246	44.81%	5,663	35.02%	3,148	19.47%	113	0.70%	1,583	9.79%	16,170
Jasper	4,809	48.62%	3,033	30.67%	2,019	20.41%	29	0.29%	1,776	17.95%	9,890
Jay	3,609	40.84%	3,208	36.31%	1,994	22.57%	25	0.28%	401	4.53%	8,836
Jefferson	4,937	37.43%	5,510	41.77%	2,565	19.45%	179	1.36%	-573	-4.34%	13,191
Jennings	4,392	42.66%	3,471	33.72%	2,370	23.02%	62	0.60%	921	8.94%	10,295
Johnson	20,353	54.36%	8,712	23.27%	8,246	22.03%	127	0.34%	11,641	31.09%	37,438
Knox	6,683	38.67%	6,718	38.87%	3,719	21.52%	164	0.95%	-35	-0.20%	17,284
Kosciusko	14,179	57.44%	5,307	21.50%	5,115	20.72%	82	0.33%	8,872	35.94%	24,683
LaGrange	3,584	48.15%	2,093	28.12%	1,736	23.32%	31	0.42%	1,491	20.03%	7,444
Lake	53,867	28.91%	102,778	55.17%	28,635	15.37%	1,018	0.55%	-48,911	-26.26%	186,298
LaPorte	14,962	35.24%	17,717	41.72%	9,641	22.70%	143	0.34%	-2,755	-6.48%	42,463
Lawrence	7,712	45.96%	5,557	33.11%	3,452	20.57%	60	0.36%	2,155	12.85%	16,781
Madison	23,479	39.76%	22,276	37.72%	13,100	22.18%	203	0.34%	1,203	2.04%	59,058
Marion	141,369	43.66%	122,234	37.75%	57,878	17.88%	2,309	0.71%	19,135	5.91%	323,790
Marshall	8,048	48.58%	4,912	29.65%	3,522	21.26%	85	0.51%	3,136	18.93%	16,567
Martin	2,523	46.40%	2,018	37.11%	883	16.24%	14	0.26%	505	9.29%	5,438
Miami	6,416	46.10%	3,967	28.50%	3,428	24.63%	107	0.77%	2,449	17.60%	13,918
Monroe	16,661	38.22%	19,712	45.22%	6,943	15.93%	271	0.62%	-3,051	-7.00%	43,587
Montgomery	7,602	52.20%	3,371	23.15%	3,511	24.11%	80	0.55%	4,091	28.09%	14,564
Morgan	10,939	51.83%	4,690	22.22%	5,375	25.47%	103	0.49%	5,564	26.36%	21,107
Newton	2,295	42.95%	1,757	32.88%	1,274	23.84%	18	0.34%	538	10.07%	5,344
Noble	5,883	42.90%	4,411	32.17%	3,328	24.27%	91	0.66%	1,472	10.73%	13,713
Ohio	1,009	40.14%	970	38.58%	527	20.96%	8	0.32%	39	1.56%	2,514
Orange	3,738	46.64%	2,948	36.78%	1,296	16.17%	33	0.41%	790	9.86%	8,015
Owen	2,753	42.00%	2,207	33.67%	1,563	23.84%	32	0.49%	546	8.33%	6,555
Parke	2,953	41.60%	2,429	34.22%	1,696	23.89%	21	0.30%	524	7.38%	7,099
Perry	2,973	31.69%	4,829	51.47%	1,560	16.63%	20	0.21%	-1,856	-19.78%	9,382
Pike	2,156	33.84%	2,960	46.46%	1,238	19.43%	17	0.27%	-804	-12.62%	6,371
Porter	22,644	39.68%	21,022	36.84%	13,096	22.95%	305	0.53%	1,622	2.84%	57,067
Posey	4,435	38.72%	4,632	40.44%	2,357	20.58%	29	0.25%	-197	-1.72%	11,453
Pulaski	2,712	45.84%	1,950	32.96%	1,214	20.52%	40	0.68%	762	12.88%	5,916
Putnam	5,341	44.33%	3,487	28.94%	3,174	26.34%	46	0.38%	1,854	15.39%	12,048
Randolph	4,937	41.90%	3,870	32.84%	2,939	24.94%	38	0.32%	1,067	9.06%	11,784
Ripley	5,033	46.02%	3,480	31.82%	2,406	22.00%	18	0.16%	1,553	14.20%	10,937
Rush	3,873	48.36%	2,168	27.07%	1,948	24.33%	19	0.24%	1,705	21.29%	8,008
St. Joseph	38,934	37.27%	46,203	44.23%	18,828	18.02%	500	0.48%	-7,269	-6.96%	104,465
Scott	2,649	33.71%	4,085	51.98%	1,092	13.89%	33	0.42%	-1,436	-18.27%	7,859
Shelby	8,075	49.81%	4,560	28.13%	3,521	21.72%	55	0.34%	3,515	21.68%	16,211
Spencer	3,789	39.56%	4,301	44.90%	1,464	15.28%	25	0.26%	-512	-5.34%	9,579
Starke	3,100	35.40%	3,695	42.19%	1,885	21.52%	78	0.89%	-595	-6.79%	8,758
Steuben	4,868	42.44%	3,630	31.65%	2,896	25.25%	75	0.65%	1,238	10.79%	11,469
Sullivan	3,052	33.29%	4,211	45.93%	1,857	20.26%	48	0.52%	-1,159	-12.64%	9,168
Switzerland	1,211	35.74%	1,535	45.31%	636	18.77%	6	0.18%	-324	-9.57%	3,388
Tippecanoe	23,050	45.79%	17,343	34.46%	9,684	19.24%	257	0.51%	5,707	11.33%	50,334
Tipton	3,906	49.55%	2,125	26.96%	1,816	23.04%	36	0.46%	1,781	22.59%	7,883
Union	1,394	46.97%	898	30.26%	664	22.37%	12	0.40%	496	16.71%	2,968
Vanderburgh	30,271	39.39%	33,799	43.99%	12,513	16.28%	257	0.33%	-3,528	-4.60%	76,840
Vermillion	2,360	30.13%	3,652	46.63%	1,794	22.91%	26	0.33%	-1,292	-16.50%	7,832
Vigo	15,834	37.56%	18,050	42.81%	8,141	19.31%	136	0.32%	-2,216	-5.25%	42,161
Wabash	7,062	46.77%	4,518	29.92%	3,424	22.67%	97	0.64%	2,544	16.85%	15,101
Warren	1,601	40.00%	1,367	34.15%	1,020	25.48%	15	0.37%	234	5.85%	4,003
Warrick	8,087	39.23%	8,612	41.78%	3,862	18.73%	53	0.26%	-525	-2.55%	20,614
Washington	4,043	40.20%	4,092	40.69%	1,846	18.36%	76	0.76%	-49	-0.49%	10,057
Wayne	12,221	44.69%	9,960	36.42%	5,095	18.63%	70	0.26%	2,261	8.27%	27,346
Wells	5,799	48.17%	3,282	27.26%	2,890	24.01%	68	0.56%	2,517	20.91%	12,039
White	4,622	45.22%	2,988	29.23%	2,582	25.26%	29	0.28%	1,634	15.99%	10,221
Whitley	5,217	43.27%	3,569	29.60%	3,195	26.50%	75	0.62%	1,648	13.67%	12,056
TOTAL	989,375	42.91%	848,420	36.79%	455,934	19.77%	12,142	0.53%	140,955	6.12%	2,305,871

==== Counties that flipped from Republican to Democratic ====
- Clark
- Crawford
- Floyd
- Gibson
- Greene
- Harrison
- Jefferson
- Knox
- LaPorte
- Monroe
- Pike
- Posey
- Scott
- Spencer
- St. Joseph
- Starke
- Switzerland
- Vanderburgh
- Vigo
- Warrick
- Washington

== See also ==
- United States presidential elections in Indiana

== Bibliography ==
- Congressional Quarterly (2010). Congressional Quarterly's Guide to U.S. Elections (6th ed.). Washington D.C.: Congressional Quarterly.
- Hogsett, Joseph H. (1992). 1992 Election Report State of Indiana. Indianapolis: Indiana Secretary of State.
- Jennings, Jerry T. (1993). Voting and Registration in the Election of November 1992. Washington, D.C.: United States Department of Commerce.
- Sullivan, Robert David (June 29, 2016). "How the Red and Blue Map Evolved over the Past Century". America.
