= William Eugene Davis =

William Eugene Davis may refer to:

- William E. Davis, American head football coach, former university president and Democratic politician
- W. Eugene Davis, judge of the United States Court of Appeals for the Fifth Circuit

== See also ==
- William Davis (disambiguation)
