= William Brymer =

William Brymer may refer to:

- William Brymer (priest) (1796–1852), archdeacon of Bath
- William Brymer (politician) (1840–1909), English politician

== See also ==
- William Brymner (1855–1925), Canadian painter and educator
