= John Burgess (priest) =

Archdeacon of Bath (1930–2019)

John Edward Burgess (9 December 1930 – 9 March 2019) was an Anglican priest who was Archdeacon of Bath from 1975 to 1995.

Burgess was educated at Surbiton County Grammar School and the University of London. After six years working for Shell he went to the London School of Theology. He was ordained deacon in 1957 and priest in 1958 and then served curacies at St Mary Magdalen Bermondsey (1957–60) and St Mary's Church, Southampton (1960–62). He was Vicar of Coppenhall from 1962 to 1967; and then of Keynsham until his appointment as Archdeacon.

Burgess was married to Jonquil. He died on 9 March 2019, at the age of 88.

== Notes ==
Church of England titles
Preceded by Tom Baker	Archdeacon of Bath; 1975–1995	Succeeded by Bob Evens
