= Sydney Boyd =

Former Archdeacon of Bath

Sydney Adolphus Boyd (7 January 1857 – 17 May 1947) was Archdeacon of Bath from 1924 to 1938.

== Biography ==
Born in Landour in 1857, Boyd was educated at Clifton College and Worcester College, Oxford. He was called to the bar at the Inner Temple in 1880. However, he chose an ecclesiastical path and was shortly appointed curate of Holy Trinity, Hampstead. He held incumbencies in Norwich and Macclesfield; after which he was rector of Bath Abbey from 1902 to 1938. On 25 June 1925, he was amongst the officiating clergy at the opening of the war memorial chapel at Monkton Combe School. He died in Bath in 1947, aged 90.

== Notes ==
Church of England titles
| Preceded by Lancelot Fish | Archdeacon of Bath; 1924–1938 | Succeeded by William Selwyn |
