= Charles Moysey =

English cleric

Charles Abel Moysey (16 November 1779 – 17 December 1859) was an English cleric who was Archdeacon of Bath from 1820 to 1839.

== Early life and career ==
Moysey's father, Abel Moysey, was Member of Parliament for Bath from 1774 until 1790. He was educated at Christ Church, Oxford. After a curacy in Southwick, Hampshire he held incumbencies at Hinton Parva (Wiltshire), Martyr Worthy (Hampshire) and Walcot, Bath.

== Death ==
He died in Wellington, Somerset, aged 70.

Church of England titles
Preceded by Josiah Thomas	Archdeacon of Bath; 1820–1839	Succeeded by William Brymer
