= Staunton Batty =

Staunton Batty

Basil Staunton Batty OBE (called Staunton; (Note: While Bishop of Fulham, Batty signed himself "Staunton Fulham", the traditional way for serving bishops to sign: given name and See.) 12 May 1873 – 19 March 1952) was an Anglican suffragan bishop in the 20th century.

Batty was born into an ecclesiastical family on 12 May 1873: his father, William Edmund Batty, was Vicar of St John's, Walham Green. After education at St Paul's and Selwyn College, Cambridge, Batty began his ordained ministry as a curate at St Clement's, York. He was made deacon at Michaelmas 1896 (27 September) and ordained priest in Advent 1897 — both times by William Maclagan, Archbishop of York, at York Minister.

Following this he was Vicar of Medmenham, then Rector of South Hackney. Further incumbencies followed at St Gabriel's, Warwick Square, and Christ Church, Mayfair. He was also Rector of St Anne and St Agnes, Gresham Street. In 1926 he was ordained to the episcopate as the first Bishop of Fulham, a post he was to hold until 1947. A noted Europhile, he died on 19 March 1952.

== Notes ==
Church of England titles
New title	Bishop of Fulham; 1926 – 1947	Succeeded by William Selwyn
