= Adrian Youings =

British Anglican priest (born 1965)

Adrian Youings (born Romford, 30 July 1965) is a British Anglican priest who served as Archdeacon of Bath in the Diocese of Bath and Wells from his collation on 5 November 2017 until his resignation in June 2024.

== Early life and education ==
Youings studied biological sciences at Exeter University, graduating with a Bachelor of Science (BSc) degree in 1986. He then undertook a PhD in yeast physiology at the University of Bath. His doctoral thesis was completed in 1990 and was titled "Anaerobic growth of Saccharomyces cerevisiae with respect to uptake of cholesterol and cider fermentation". From 1993 to 1996, he studied theology and trained for ordained ministry at Wycliffe Hall, Oxford.

== Ordained ministry ==
He was ordained deacon in 1996, and priest in 1997. After curacies in Dorking and Croydon he was the Rector of Trull from 2005 to 2017, and Rural Dean of Taunton from 2015 to 2017.

Church of England titles
Preceded by Andy Piggott	Archdeacon of Bath; 2017–2024	Succeeded by Charlie Peer
