= Robert Browne (priest) =

Robert William Browne (1809 in Southwark – 1895 in Wells) was the Archdeacon of Bath from 1860 to 1895.

Bothamley was born in Southwark and educated at St John's College, Oxford. He was ordained deacon in 1832; and Priest in 1833. but stayed at St John's, firstly as Fellow and then Tutor until 1839. In that year he began studying for a PhD at the University of Heidelberg. In 1862 he became Rector of Weston-Super-Mare; and in 1863 a Canon of Wells Cathedral.

He died on 13 December 1895.

== Notes ==
Church of England titles
Preceded by William Gunning	Archdeacon of Bath; 1860–1895	Succeeded by Hilton Bothamley
