= Rapid sequence induction =

Special process for endotracheal intubation

Rapid sequence induction/intubation
- eMedicine: 80222

In anaesthesia and advanced airway management, rapid sequence induction (RSI) – also referred to as rapid sequence intubation or as rapid sequence induction and intubation (RSII) or as crash induction – is a special process for endotracheal intubation that is used where the patient is at a high risk of pulmonary aspiration. It differs from other techniques for inducing general anesthesia in that several extra precautions are taken to minimize the time between giving the induction drugs and securing the tube, during which period the patient's airway is essentially unprotected.

One important difference between RSI and routine tracheal intubation is that the anesthesiologist does not typically manually assist the ventilation of the lungs after the onset of general anesthesia and cessation of breathing until the trachea has been intubated and the cuff has been inflated. RSI is typically used in patients who are at high risk of aspiration or who are critically ill and may be performed by anaesthesiologists, intensivists, emergency physicians or, in some regions, paramedics.

== Uses ==
This procedure is used where general anesthesia must be induced before the patient has had time to fast long enough to empty the stomach; where the patient has a condition that makes aspiration more likely during induction of anesthesia, regardless of how long they have fasted (such as gastroesophageal reflux disease or advanced pregnancy); or where the patient has become unable to protect their own airway even before anesthesia (such as after a traumatic brain injury).

== Contraindications ==
There are relatively few absolute contraindications to a rapid sequence induction. The most significant contraindications include facial trauma that significantly distorts upper airway anatomy or complete airway obstruction (i.e. oropharyngeal cancer, hematoma, etc). In these cases, airway management is secured via a surgical airway instead.

== Complications ==
There are several possible complications associated with RSI. The most concerning complication is airway management in a paralyzed patient. As the sequence of RSI dictates that the patient is paralyzed prior to obtaining adequate airway access, there is the possibility that the patient is difficult to intubate. If unable to secure an airway access, the patient may be in a "cannot intubate, cannot ventilate" situation where the apneic period is prolonged and the patient does not receive oxygen. This prolonged period of apnea can lead to brain damage, circulatory collapse, and death. In this situation, one must consider the difficult airway algorithm with the possibility of waking the patient with paralytic reversal medications such as sugammadex.

Conversely, the induction drugs classically used for RSI have short durations of action, wearing off after only minutes. This confers a degree of fault tolerance on the procedure when it is used in elective or semi-elective settings: if intubation is unsuccessful, and if the clinical condition allows it, the procedure may be abandoned and the patient should regain the ability to protect their own airway sooner than would be the case under routine methods of induction. Another possible complication is anaphylaxis in response to a neuromuscular blockade. Neuromuscular blockade agents are considered one of the highest anaphylaxis-inducing substances in the operating room, along with latex, penicillin, and chlorhexidine. In this case, the anesthesiologist must be able to treat the anaphylaxis and resulting complications in a compromised patient.

Upper airway anatomy

The process of applying cricoid pressure during Sellick's maneuver can introduce complications such as laryngeal distortion, failure to completely occlude the esophagus, and potential esophageal rupture if the patient is actively vomiting.

== Technique ==
=== Common medications ===
==== Premedication ====
Premedication is used to reduce anxiety of those who are going to be intubated and to reduce the anticipated physiological response of the patient during intubation.

- Midazolam – It is a fast-acting and the most lipophilic of all benzodiazepine and rapidly crosses the blood–brain barrier. It is a gamma-aminobutyric acid (GABA) agonist. Usual doses for midazolam are 1 mg to 2 mg where the older people receive smaller doses and obese people receive higher doses. Midazolam is metabolized in the liver and is excreted through the kidneys. When midazolam is used alone, it has few side effects, but can cause respiratory depression if being used together with fentanyl.
- Fentanyl – It is a synthetic, centrally-acting opioid. It suppresses pain and sympathetic stimulation. Sympathetic stimulation can cause further injury to those with heart disease, aortic dissection, and aortic aneurysm. Fentanyl is ideal because of its rapid onset, lack of histamine release, high lipophilicity, and short duration of action. The dosage is between 1 and 3 μg/kg. It is metabolized by liver. The most significant side effect is respiratory depression.
- Atropine – The process of intubation can cause massive stimulation to vagus nerve, causing bradycardia (low heart rate). The people who are at increased risk of bradycardia are neonates and children. This does not happen in adults because sympathetic stimulation overpowers the vagal response. However, for those adults who have received drugs such as beta blocker, calcium channel blocker, and digoxin have an increased risk of developing bradycardia. Atropine is a muscarinic receptor antagonist, thus blocking the vagal response. The dose is 10 mcg/kg. It has quick onset of action, and common side effects are: increased heart rate, dry mouth, flushing, and urinary retention.
- Lidocaine – It is used to reduce the sympathetic response in those who have suspected raised intracranial pressure (ICP) or those who received succinylcholine which also causes increase ICP or those with underlying asthma that have bronchospasm. Administration of lidocaine can cause reduction in mean arterial pressure (MAP). The dosage is 1.5 mg/kg. This drug is metabolized by liver. The side effects are: hypotension, arrhythmia (irregular heart beat). Lidocaine can further interact with other drugs such as amiodarone and monoamine oxidase inhibitor to cause hypotension, and dronedarone to cause arrhythmia.

==== Induction agents ====
Administration of induction agents followed by neuromuscular blockade agents helps to achieve optimal conditions for intubation.

- Etomidate – It is an imidazole-derivative that stimulates GABA receptors. The dosage is between 0.2 and 0.6 mg/kg (commonly 20 to 50 mg doses). Dose reduction may be required in those with hypotension. Etomidate has minimal cardiovascular side effects, reduces intracerebral pressure (by reducing cerebral blood flow), and does not cause histamine release. It has quick onset of action, short duration of action, and undergoes hepatic elimination. Myoclonus, pain at the site of the injection, post-operative nausea and vomiting are common. While common, the incidence and severity myoclonus can be reduced with pretreatment lidocaine without affecting hemodynamic stability of the patient. A rare but serious potential complication is that etomidate can also suppresses the production of cortisol and aldosterone.
- Ketamine – It is highly lipophilic and crosses the blood-brain barrier. It inhibits the binding of glutamine to N-Methyl-D-aspartic acid (NMDA) receptors in Thalamocortical radiations and limbic system, causing amnesia. Through the same blockade of NMDA receptor, ketamine is also effective as a painkiller. The dosage is 1 to 2 mg/kg, usually given at 100 mg. Ketamine is metabolized by liver and excreted through kidneys. The drug lessen the reuptake of the catecholamine, increases heart rate, blood pressure, and cardiac output, thus suitable for those with hypotension. However, it can worsen the cardiac depression and hypotension for those with depletion of catecholamines. Thus, maximum dose of 1.5 mg/kg is needed for this situation. For those with head injuries, ketamine does not appear to increase intracranial pressure, while able to maintain the mean arterial pressure. Ketamine also relieves bronchospasm by relaxing bronchiolar smooth muscles. However, it increases oral secretions during intubation. Ketamine is associated with nightmares, delirium, and hallucinations.
- Propofol – It is a highly lipid-soluble, GABA agonist. The dosage is 1.5 mg/kg (usually 100 to 200 mg). It has quick onset of action, can cross the blood-brain barrier, wide tissue distribution, and can be hepatically cleared by the body quickly. In the elderly, the rate of Propofol clearance is low. Therefore, lower doses of Propofol (50 to 100 mg) should be given. It is suitable in those with kidney or liver impairment and decreases intra-cranial pressure. For those with bronchospasm, Propofol also has mild bronchodilating effect. However, Propofol can induce hypotension and bradycardia due to its calcium channel blocker and beta blocker properties. At prolonged high Propofol dosages, it can induce Propofol infusion syndrome, characterized by acute refractory bradycardia leading to asystole accompanied by one of the following: rhabdomyolysis, acute fatty liver or enlarged liver, and metabolic acidosis. Pain during peripheral administration of Propofol can be reduced by using pretreatment lidocaine or a large bore cannula.
- Midazolam – Apart as a premedication, midazolam can be used as an induction agent at the dose of 0.2 to 0.3 mg/kg. It has slow onset of action when used alone, but the onset can be improved when using together with an opioid. However, for those with hypotension, midazolam can further reduce the blood pressure and has cardiac depressive effects. Therefore, dose reduction is required for the elderly, and for those with heart and liver failure.
- Methohexital – This is a barbiturate drug that works as a GABA agonist, reducing the dissociation of GABA A from its receptors. The dosage is 1.5 mg/kg. It is metabolized in liver. However, methohexital can cause respiratory depression, laryngospasm, venodilatation, myocardial depression, and hypotension. Additionally, it can also cause reduced cerebral blood flow and histamine release. It can cause distal thrombosis and tissue necrosis if given into the arterial system. This drug is commonly associated with pain when given through small peripheral veins. This can be prevented by dissolving the drug into a lipophilic mixture without reducing the potency of the drug.

==== Paralytics ====
Paralytics are also known as neuromuscular-blocking drugs (NMB). NMB can reduce the complication rates of rapid sequence induction such as inadequate oxygenation of the blood, airway complications, and instability of the cardiovascular system. NMB can be divided into two types: depolarising and non-depolarizing blockers. Depolarizing blockers resembles the acetylcholine and activates the motor end-plate of the neuromuscular junction (NMJ). Meanwhile, non-depolarizing blockers competitively blocks the NMJ without activating the motor end plate.

===== Depolarizing blockers =====
- Succinylcholine – This drug has rapid onset of action and fast duration. Its dosages are between 1 and 2 mg/kg body weight with common dosage of 100 mg. The drug can only be kept under room temperature for 14 days. Therefore, for longer shelf life, it has to be kept under temperatures from 3.3 °C (37.9 °F) to 8.7 °C (47.7 °F). When the intravenous access is not obtainable, the 3 to 4 mg/kg of intramuscular doses can be given (usual dose of 300 mg). However, duration of onset will be delayed to 3 to 4 minutes. Repetitive dosages of succinylcholine are discouraged to prevent vagal stimulation which leads to bradycardia. There are many absolute contraindications to succinylcholine including recent stroke, hyperkalemia, burn patients, immobilized patients. This is due to the upregulation of neuromuscular junctions. Additionally, cautions should be used in patients with reduced serum plasma cholinesterase, as this is how the drug removed from the body. In patients with decreased plasma cholinesterase, the paralysis from succinylcholine can increase significantly in duration. A common side effect of succinylcholine includes myalgias after neuromuscular induced fasciculations upon induction.

===== Non-depolarizing blockers =====
- Rocuronium – The dosage of rocuronium is between 0.6 and 1.2 mg/kg. Since rocuronium has longer duration of onset, caution should be taken for those who are difficult to bag-mask ventilate. While rare, anaphylactic reactions have been known to occur with rocuronium. While historically this was not the paralytic of choice in RSI due to the longer duration of action, with the recent approval of Sugammadex as a reversal agent the concern for a long duration of paralysis is reduced.
- Vecuronium – The dosage of this drug is between 0.08 and 0.1 mg/kg. Vecuronium is only used when there is a shortage of drugs such as succinylcholine and rocuronium.

===== Reversal agents =====
- Sugammadex – It is used as a reversal agent for rocuronium and vecuronium. It works by encapsulating the paralytic drug thus preventing it from acting on the binding sites. The dose of 16 mg/kg is used for immediate reversal after administration such as during RSI. Doses of 2 mg/kg and 4 mg/kg are used if the patient has twitches evident on a twitch monitor and terminates the rocuronium action within 3 minutes. The FDA initially did not approve Sugammadex due to concerns over potential allergic reactions, however it was subsequently approved on December 15, 2015, for use in the United States.
- Neostigmine – It can be used to reverse nondepolarizing neuromuscular blocking agents which cannot be reversed with Sugammadex, although its onset is much slower. It works by competitively inhibiting acetylcholinesterase, an enzyme that breaks down acetylcholine. This results in an accumulation of acetylcholine present in the neuromuscular junction, effectively reversing the paralysis of the patient. The dosage is between 0.03 and 0.07 mg/kg. A common side effect of this drug is bradycardia. Therefore, glycopyrrolate, an anticholinergic drug, should be given immediately prior to neostigmine to prevent bradycardia.

==== Other medications ====
- Thiopental
- Metaraminol or ephedrine, where hypotension may occur secondary to the sedating drugs.
- Phenylephrine – This drug is administered to those with hypotension post intubation as a result of lidocaine, midazolam, fentanyl, Propofol, and ketamine. The dosages range from 50 to 200 μg in adults. It has quick onset and quick elimination. The common side effect is reflex bradycardia.

=== Pre-Intubation Steps ===
Rapid sequence intubation refers to the pharmacologically induced sedation and neuromuscular paralysis prior to intubation of the trachea. The technique is a quicker form of the process normally used to induce general anesthesia. A useful framework for describing the technique of RSI is the "seven Ps".

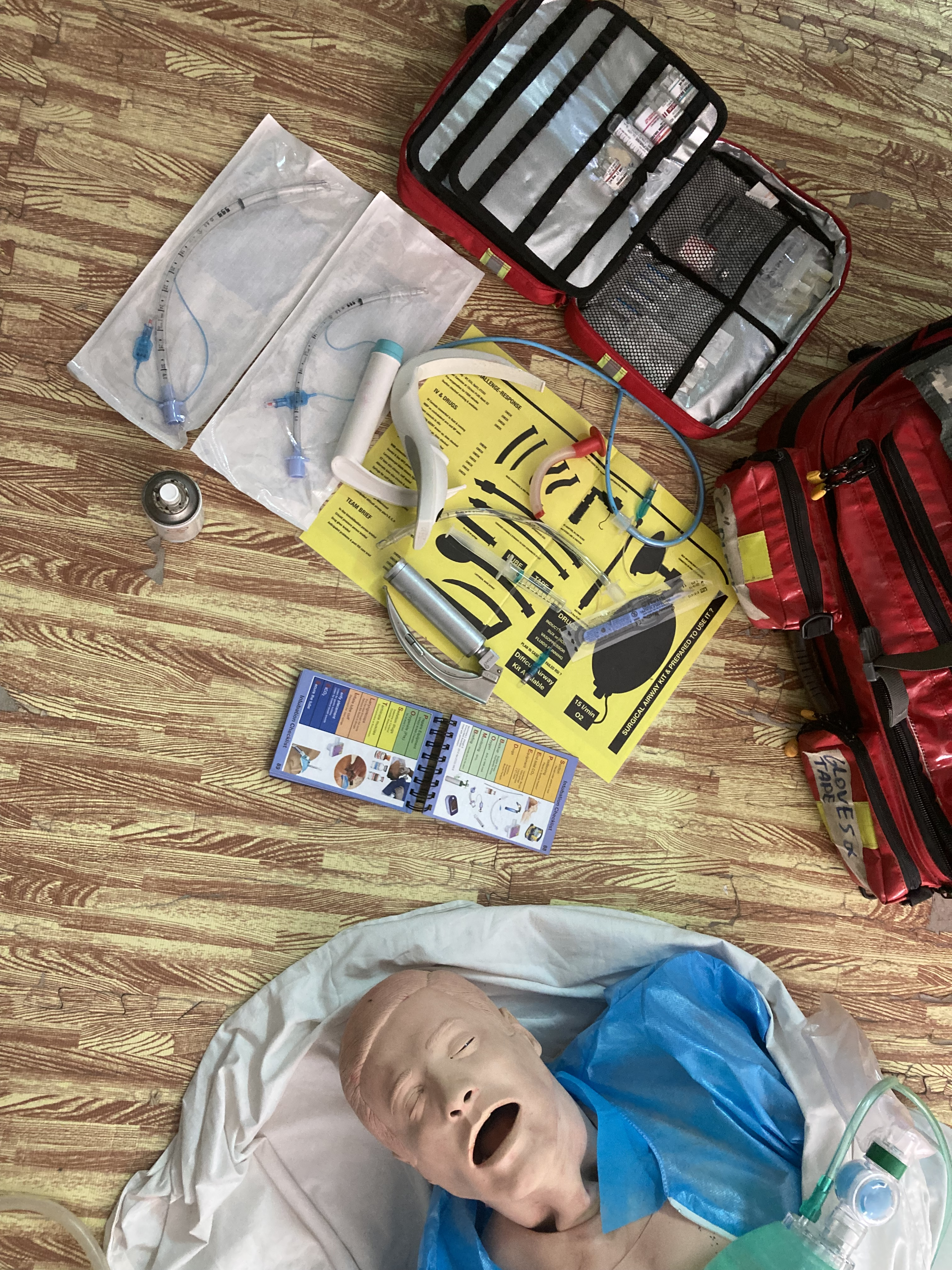
Prehospital RSI training using a checklist

==== Preparation ====
The patient is assessed to predict the difficulty of intubation. Continuous physiological monitoring such as ECG and pulse oximetry is put on the patient. The equipment and drugs for the intubation are planned, including the endotracheal tube size, the laryngoscope size, and drug dosage. Drugs are prepared in syringes. Intravenous access is obtained to deliver the drugs, usually by placing one or two IV cannulae.

==== Preoxygenation ====
The aim of preoxygenation is to replace the nitrogen that forms the majority of the functional residual capacity with oxygen. This provides an oxygen reservoir in the lungs that will delay the depletion of oxygen in the absence of ventilation (after paralysis). For a healthy adult, this can lead to maintaining a blood oxygen saturation of at least 90% for up to 8 minutes. This time will be significantly reduced in obese patients, ill patients and children. Preoxygenation is usually performed by giving 100% oxygen via a tightly fitting face mask. Preoxygenation or a maximum of eight deep breaths over 60 seconds resulting in blood oxygenation is not different from that of quiet breathing volume for 3 minutes.

Newer methods of preoxygenation include the use of a nasal cannula placed on the patient at 15 LPM at least 5 minutes prior to the administration of the sedation and paralytic drugs. High flow nasal oxygen has been shown to flush the nasopharynx with oxygen, and then when patients inspire they inhale a higher percentage of inspired oxygen. Small changes in FiO2 create dramatic changes in the availability of oxygen at the alveolus, and these increases result in marked expansion of the oxygen reservoir in the lungs prior to the induction of apnea. After apnea created by RSI the same high flow nasal cannula will help maintain oxygen saturation during efforts securing the tube (oral intubation). The use of nasal oxygen during pre-oxygenation and continued during apnea can prevent hypoxia before and during intubation, even in extreme clinical cases.

==== Pretreatment ====
Pretreatment consists of the medications given to specific groups of high-risk patients 3 minutes before the paralysis stage with the aim of protecting the patient from the adverse effects of introducing the laryngoscope and endotracheal tube. Intubation causes increased sympathetic activity, an increase in intracranial pressure and bronchospasm. Patients with reactive airway disease, increased intracranial pressure, or cardiovascular disease may benefit from pretreatment. Two common medications used in the pretreatment of RSI include Lidocaine and Atropine. Lidocaine has the ability to suppress the cough reflex which in turn may mitigate increased intracranial pressure. For this reason Lidocaine is commonly used as a pretreatment for trauma patients who are suspected of already having an increase in intracranial pressure. Although there is not yet definitive evidence to support this, if proper dosing is used it is safe. The typical dose is 1.5 mg/kg IV given three minutes prior to intubation. Atropine may also be used as a premedication agent in pediatrics to prevent bradycardia caused by hypoxia, laryngoscopy, and succinylcholine. Atropine is a parasympathetic blocker. The common premedication dose for atropine is 0.01–0.02 mg/kg.

==== Paralysis with induction ====
With standard intravenous induction of general anesthesia, the patient typically receives an opioid, and then a hypnotic medication. Generally the patient will be manually ventilated for a short period of time before a neuromuscular blocking agent is administered and the patient is intubated. During rapid sequence induction, the person still receives an IV opioid. However, the difference lies in the fact that the induction drug and neuromuscular blocking agent are administered in rapid succession with no time allowed for manual ventilation.

Commonly used hypnotics include thiopental, propofol and etomidate. The neuromuscular blocking agents paralyze all of the skeletal muscles, most notably and importantly in the oropharynx, larynx, and diaphragm. Opioids such as fentanyl may be given to attenuate the responses to the intubation process (accelerated heart rate and increased intracranial pressure). This is supposed to have advantages in patients with ischemic heart disease and those with brain injury (e.g. after traumatic brain injury or stroke). Lidocaine is also theorized to blunt a rise in intracranial pressure during laryngoscopy, although this remains controversial and its use varies greatly. Atropine may be used to prevent a reflex bradycardia from vagal stimulation during laryngoscopy, especially in young children and infants. Despite their common use, such adjunctive medications have not been demonstrated to improve outcomes.

==== Positioning ====
Positioning involves bringing the axes of the mouth, pharynx, and larynx into alignment, leading to what's called the "sniffing" position. The sniffing position can be achieved by placing a rolled towel underneath the head and neck, effectively extending the head and flexing the neck. You are at proper alignment when the ear is inline with the sternum.

As described by Brian Arthur Sellick in 1961, cricoid pressure (alternatively known as Sellick's maneuver) may be used to occlude the esophagus with the goal of preventing aspiration.

==== Placement of tube ====
During this stage, laryngoscopy is performed to visualize the glottis. Modern practice involves the passing of a "Bougie", a thin tube, past the vocal cords and over which the endotracheal tube is then passed. The bougie is then removed and an inbuilt cuff at the end of the tube is inflated, (via a thin secondary tube and a syringe), to hold it in place and prevent aspiration of stomach contents.

The position of the tube in the trachea can be confirmed in a number of ways, including observing increasing end tidal carbon dioxide, auscultation of both lungs and stomach, chest movement, and misting of the tube.

==== Postintubation management ====
Mispositioning of the endotracheal tube (in a bronchus, above the glottis, or in the esophagus) should be excluded by confirmation of end tidal CO_{2}, auscultation, fogging of the endotracheal tube, and observation of bilateral chest rise.

== History ==
First described by William Stept and Peter Safar in 1970, "classical" or "traditional" RSI involves pre-filling the patient's lungs with a high concentration of oxygen gas; applying cricoid pressure to occlude the esophagus; administering pre-determined doses of rapid-onset sedative and neuromuscular-blocking drugs (traditionally thiopentone and succinylcholine) that induce prompt unconsciousness and paralysis; avoiding any artificial positive-pressure ventilation by mask after the patient stops breathing (to minimize insufflation of air into the stomach, which might otherwise provoke regurgitation); inserting a cuffed endotracheal tube with minimal delay; and then releasing the cricoid pressure after the cuff is inflated, with ventilation being started through the tube. There is no consensus around the precise definition of the term "modified RSI", but it is used to refer to various modifications that deviate from the classic sequence – usually to improve the patient's physiological stability during the procedure, at the expense of theoretically increasing the risk of regurgitation. Examples of such modifications include using various alternative drugs, omitting the cricoid pressure, or applying ventilation before the tube has been secured.

== Special Populations ==
Age can play a role in whether or not the procedure is warranted, and is commonly needed in younger persons. The clinician that performs Rapid Sequence Induction and Intubation (RSII) must be skilled in tracheal intubation and also in bag valve mask ventilation. Alternative airway management devices must be immediately available, in the event the trachea cannot be intubated using conventional techniques. Such devices include the combitube and the laryngeal mask airway. Invasive techniques such as cricothyrotomy must also be available in the event of inability to intubate the trachea by conventional techniques.

RSI is mainly used to intubate patients at high risk of aspiration, mostly due to a full stomach as commonly seen in a trauma setting. Bag ventilation causes distention of stomach which can induce vomiting, so this phase must be quick. The patient is given a sedative and paralytic agent, usually midazolam / succinylcholine / Propofol and intubation is quickly attempted with minimal or no manual ventilation. The patient is assessed for predictable intubation difficulties. Laryngoscope blades and endotracheal tubes smaller than would be used in a non-emergency setting are selected.

If the patient on initial assessment is found to have a difficult airway, RSI is contraindicated since a failed RSI attempt will leave no option but to ventilate the patient on bag and mask which can lead to vomiting. For these challenging cases, awake fiberoptic intubation is usually preferred.

== Controversy ==
Since the introduction of RSI, there has been controversy regarding virtually every aspect of this technique, including:

- choice of intravenous hypnotic agents as well as their dosage and timing of administration
- dosage and timing of administration of neuromuscular blocking agents
- avoidance of manual ventilation before tracheal intubation
- optimal position and whether the head-up, head-down, or horizontal supine position is the safest for induction of anesthesia in full-stomach patients
- application of cricoid pressure, which is also referred to as the Sellick maneuver.
