= Lancelot Fish =

English Anglican priest

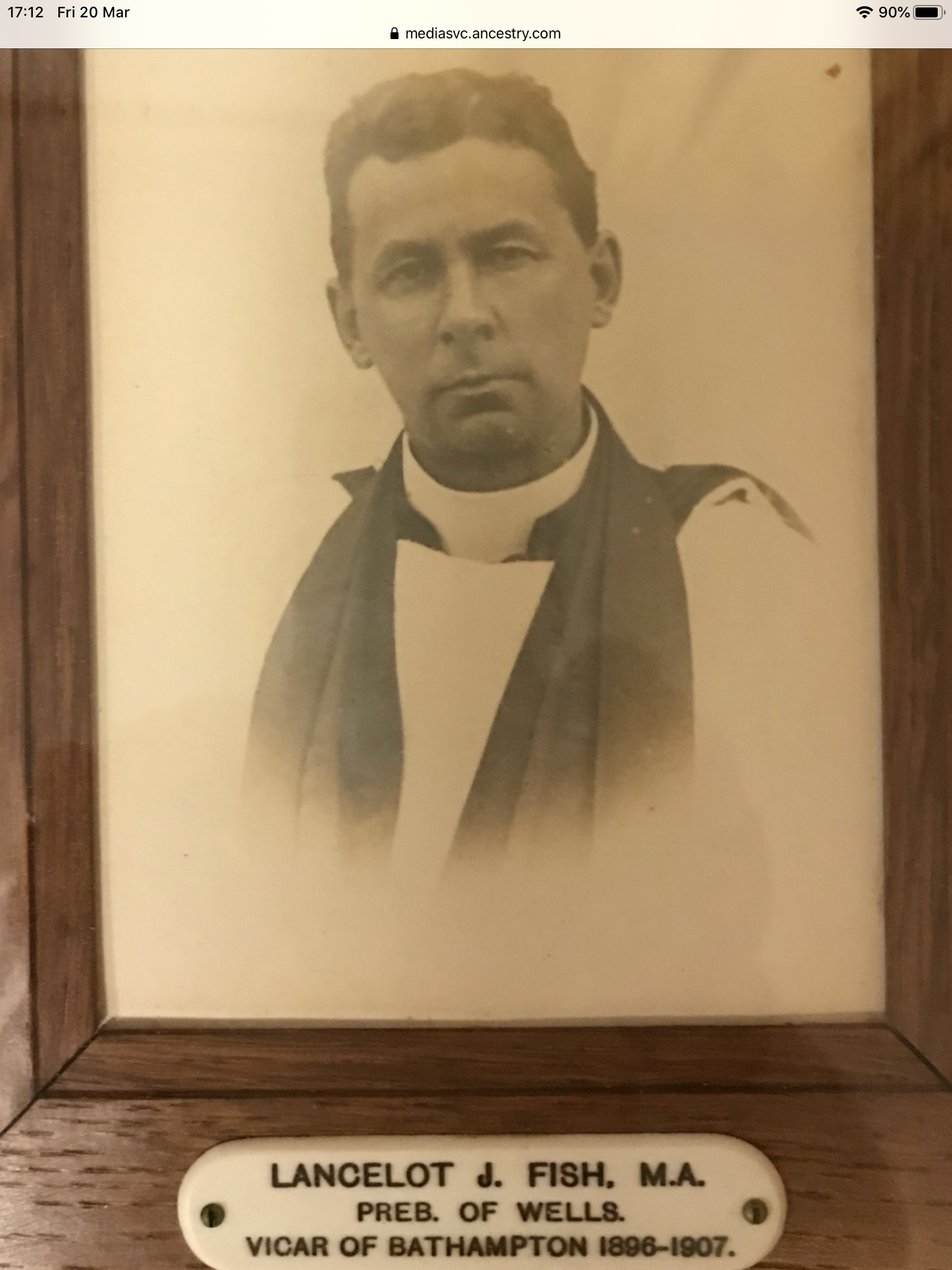
Archdeacon Lancelot John Fish

Lancelot John Fish (2 August 1861 – 9 September 1924) was Archdeacon of Bath from 1909 until his death on 29 September 1924.

Lancelot was born in Whitchurch, Shropshire to John Dent Fish and Henrietta Barnes Chesterman. He was educated at Harrow and Trinity College, Cambridge. He was Chaplain at Christ Church, Cannes from 1900 to 1903; Vicar of Bathampton until 1907; He was Chaplain at St Andrew, Biarritz from 1907 to 1909; and then Vicar of St Stephen Lansdown, Bath until 1923. from 1902 to 1938.

Church of England titles
Preceded by Hilton Bothamley	Archdeacon of Bath; 1909–1924	Succeeded by Sydney Boyd
