= Andy Piggott =

Andrew John Piggott (born 27 September 1951) is a British Anglican priest. From 2005 to 2017, he was the Archdeacon of Bath in the Diocese of Bath and Wells.

== Early life and education ==
Piggott was educated at Queen Mary College, London and St John's College, Nottingham. He was a teacher before his call to ministry.

== Ordained ministry ==
He was ordained deacon in 1986; and priest in 1987. His first post was a curacy at St Philip with St James, Dorridge. After this he held incumbencies at St Chad, Kidderminster then St Lawrence, Biddulph. He was with the Church Pastoral Aid Society from 1999 to 2005. In 2005, he was appointed the Archdeacon of Bath in the Diocese of Bath and Wells. He has been a member of the General Synod of the Church of England since 2009. He retired as archdeacon effective 30 June 2017.

Church of England titles
Preceded by Bob Evens	Archdeacon of Bath; 2005–2017	Succeeded by Adrian Youings
