= William Gunning =

Archdeacon of Bath

William Gunning (21 June 1796 – 11 October 1860) was an English cleric. He was Archdeacon of Bath from his installation on 9 October 1852 until his death on 11 October 1860.

== Notes ==
Church of England titles
Preceded by William Brymer	Archdeacon of Bath; 1852–1860	Succeeded by Robert Browne
