= George Ingle =

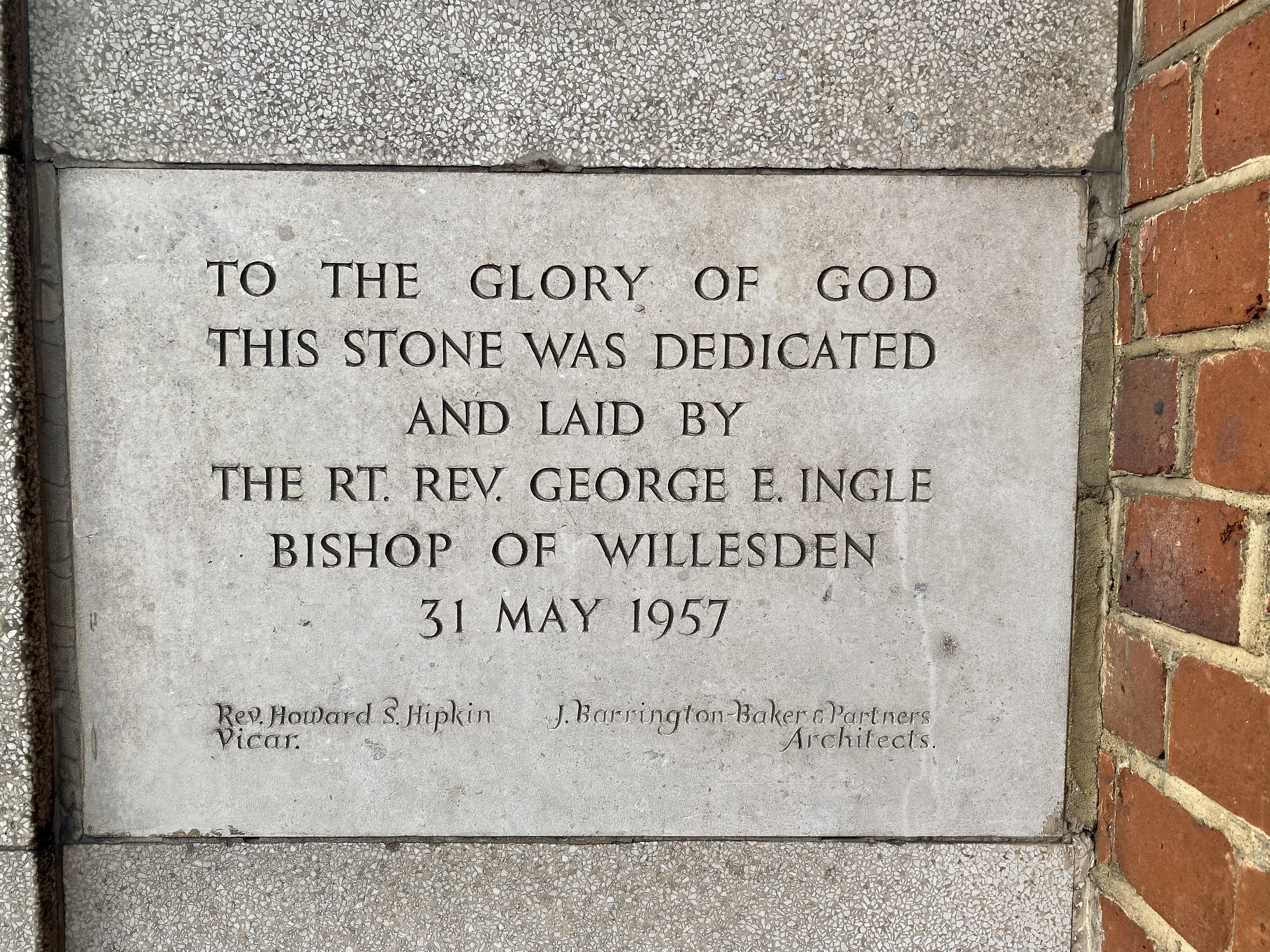
1957 foundation stone laid by Ingle as Bishop of Willesden

George Ernest Ingle (1895–1964) was an Anglican suffragan bishop.

Born into an ecclesiastical family in 1895, he was educated at Felsted and Jesus College, Cambridge. After wartime service with the Royal Norfolk Regiment, he embarked on an ecclesiastical career with a curacy at St Peter's, Cranley Gardens, Hammersmith. Following this, he was Chaplain to the London Irish Rifles then of the British Embassy Church, Paris. A long period as a master at his old school, Felsted, was followed by short posts as Vicar of St John's, Greenhill, Harrow and as Rural Dean of the British Zone of Germany before he was elevated to the episcopate as the third Bishop of Fulham, a post he held for only seven years. Translated to Willesden, he died on 10 June 1964.

== Notes ==
Church of England titles
Preceded by William Marshall Selwyn	Bishop of Fulham; 1949 – 1956	Succeeded by Robert Stopford
Preceded by Gerald Ellison	Bishop of Willesden; 1956 – 1964	Succeeded by Graham Leonard
