= Cricoid pressure =

Medical maneuver

Cricoid pressure, also known as the Sellick manoeuvre or Sellick maneuver, is a technique used in endotracheal intubation to try to reduce the risk of regurgitation. The technique involves the application of pressure to the cricoid cartilage at the neck, thus occluding the esophagus which passes directly behind it.

Cricoid pressure should not be confused with the "BURP" (Backwards Upwards Rightwards Pressure) manoeuvre, which is used to improve the view of the glottis during laryngoscopy and tracheal intubation, rather than to prevent regurgitation. As the name implies, the BURP manoeuvre requires a clinician to apply pressure on the thyroid cartilage posteriorly, then cephalad (upwards) and, finally, laterally towards the patient's right.

== History and technique ==
In 1961 Brian Arthur Sellick (1918–1996), an anaesthetist, published the paper Cricoid pressure to control regurgitation of stomach contents during induction of anesthesia—preliminary communication, describing the application of cricoid pressure for the prevention of regurgitation. The technique involves the application of backward pressure on the cricoid cartilage with a force of 20–44 newtons to occlude the esophagus, preventing aspiration of gastric contents during induction of anesthesia and in resuscitation of emergency victims when intubation is delayed or not possible. Some believe that cricoid pressure in pediatric population, especially neonates, improves glottic view and aids tracheal intubation apart from its classical role in rapid sequence intubation for aspiration prophylaxis.

== Usage ==
=== Rapid sequence induction ===
In many countries, cricoid pressure has been widely used during rapid sequence induction for nearly fifty years, despite a lack of compelling evidence to support this practice. The initial article by Sellick was based on a small sample size at a time when high tidal volumes, head-down positioning and barbiturate anesthesia were the rule. Beginning around 2000, a significant body of evidence has accumulated which questions the effectiveness of cricoid pressure, and the application may in fact displace the esophagus laterally instead of compressing it as described by Sellick.

Cricoid pressure may also compress the glottis, which can obstruct the view of the laryngoscopist and actually cause a delay in securing the airway. Some clinicians believe the use of cricoid pressure should be abandoned because of the lack of scientific evidence of benefit and possible complications.

=== Prevention of gas insufflation ===
The technique is also important in possibly preventing insufflation of gas into the stomach. A study concluded that appropriate application of cricoid pressure prevents gastric gas insufflation during airway management via mask up to 40 cm H_{2}O peak inspiratory pressure (PIP) in infants and children. An additional benefit of cricoid pressure occurs in paralyzed patients in whom gastric insufflation occurs at lower inflation pressures.

== Controversy ==
Anterior cricoid pressure was considered the standard of care during Rapid Sequence Intubation for many years. The American Heart Association, until the 2010 science update, advocated the use of cricoid pressure during resuscitation using a BVM, and during emergent oral endotracheal intubation; effective 2010, use of Cricoid Pressure is now discouraged during the routine intubation of cardiac arrest victims.

Cricoid pressure may frequently be applied incorrectly. Cricoid pressure may frequently displace the esophagus laterally, instead of compressing it as described by Sellick. Several studies demonstrate some degree of glottic compression reduction in tidal volume and increase in peak pressures.

The initial proposal of cricoid pressure as a useful clinical procedure, its subsequent adoption as the lynchpin of patient safety, and its current decline into disfavor represents a classic example of the need for evidence-based medicine, and the evolution of medical practice.

== Side effects ==
As all techniques, cricoid pressure has indications, contraindications and side effects. It is associated with nausea/vomiting and it may cause esophageal rupture and also may make tracheal intubation and make ventilation difficult or impossible. Cricoid force greater than 40 N can compromise airway patency and make tracheal intubation difficult. Cricoid pressure may displace the esophagus, make ventilation with a facemask or with a laryngeal mask airway (LMA) more difficult, interfere with LMA placement and advancement of a tracheal tube and alter laryngeal visualization by a flexible bronchoscope. However, other investigators have found that cricoid pressure does not increase the rate of failed intubation.

== See also ==
- Rapid sequence induction
- Intubation
- Mechanical ventilation
