= John P. Davis =

American journalist (1905–1973)

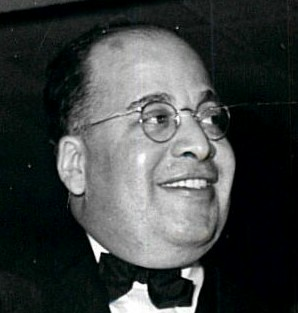
- Born: John Preston Davis; January 19, 1905; Washington, D.C., US
- Died: September 11, 1973 (aged 68)
- Education: Bates College, Harvard Law School
- Known for: Founder of the National Negro Congress
- Spouse: Marguerite DeMond

John Preston Davis (January 19, 1905 – September 11, 1973) was an American journalist, lawyer and activist intellectual, who became prominent for his work with the Joint Committee on National Recovery (JCNR). In 1935, he co-founded the National Negro Congress, an organization dedicated to the advancement of African Americans during the Great Depression.

In 1946, he founded Our World magazine, a full-size, nationally distributed publication for African-American readers. He also published the American Negro Reference Book, covering virtually every aspect of African-American life, present and past.

== Biography ==
John P. Davis was born in Washington, D.C., the son of Dr. William Henry Davis and Julia Davis. His father was a graduate of Howard University and served as principal of Armstrong High School. During World War I, Dr. Davis was appointed as Secretary to Dr. Emmett Jay Scott, Special Assistant to the United States Secretary of War. In the 1920s, Dr. Davis served as Secretary to the Presidential Commission investigating the economic conditions in the Virgin Islands.

== The early years ==
Davis attended segregated schools in Washington, D.C., graduating from the elite Dunbar High School, which stressed an academic curriculum. In 1922, he enrolled in Bates College in Lewiston, Maine. He graduated in 1926, earning an A.B. and double honors in English and Psychology. At Bates, he was president of Delta Sigma Rho, an honorary debating fraternity, and editor of the student publication The Bobcat. He enlisted the aid of Bates trustee Louis B. Costello, when Delta Sigma Rho's national council denied him membership because of his race.

Davis toured Europe with the Bates College debating team. He was among the first African-American men to be sent overseas under the auspices of the American University Union to engage in international debate; his team from Bates met and defeated Cambridge University. While an undergraduate at Bates College, Davis was nominated for a Rhodes scholarship. He contributed short stories to The Crisis, official magazine of the NAACP, and Opportunity: A Journal of Negro Life, published by the National Urban League. His short story "The Overcoat" was a prize-winner in Opportunity's 1926–27 literary contest.

With his literary interests, Davis was drawn into the Harlem Renaissance. After college, he moved to New York City, where for a time, he replaced the celebrated scholar W. E. B. Du Bois as literary editor of The Crisis. During this period, Davis joined with other young black writers – Zora Neale Hurston, Langston Hughes, Gwendolyn Bennett, Wallace Thurman, Aaron Douglas, Richard Bruce – to produce Fire!!, a magazine devoted to young African-American artists.

== Harvard University ==
Davis had a fellowship to Harvard University from 1926 to 1927, and earned his master's degree in journalism. He left Harvard to join the staff of Fisk University, a historically black college in Nashville, where he served as Director of Publicity from (1927 to 1928). He returned to Harvard University and earned an LLB degree from Harvard Law School in 1933.

At Harvard, Davis cemented lifelong friendships with a small core of black students, including fellow Dunbar High School alumni Robert C. Weaver, later appointed as the first black member of a Presidential cabinet; William Hastie, later appointed as the first black federal judge; and Ralph Bunche, later a statesman and diplomat who was awarded a Nobel Peace Prize.

These friends remained important to Davis throughout his career. During their student years, the men discussed race and politics, especially the inadequacy of the black Republican leadership. When the Great Depression intensified the social and economic problems confronting black America, Davis and his colleagues looked to the example of Reconstruction, when federal power was used to redress the plight of former slaves. They called on the federal government to ensure black civil and political rights. The New Deal of Franklin D. Roosevelt seemed to offer the possibility of federal intervention for economic justice.

== Marriage and family ==
Davis married Marguerite DeMond, the daughter of Reverend Abraham Lincoln DeMond and Lula Watkins (Patterson) DeMond. Marguerite had attended Avery Normal Institute in Charleston, South Carolina, operated by the American Missionary Association and the Congregationalist Church. Even before the Civil War, Avery Normal Institute's racially integrated faculty was providing quality educations for African Americans. She attended Syracuse University in 1931 and came to Washington, D.C., with her mother in 1932, after the death of her father.

Marguerite DeMond went to work as a researcher for African-American historian Carter G. Woodson's Association for the Study of African American Life and History. After a one-year courtship, she and Davis were married. They had four children, including Michael DeMond Davis, who became a journalist and author of Black American Women in Olympic Track and Field and the Thurgood Marshall biography.

== Joint Committee on National Recovery ==
In 1933, John P. Davis, formed the Negro Industrial League (NIL), a loosely structured social movement organization, and the Joint Committee on National Recovery (JCNR), a movement organization network, to monitor National Recovery Administration hearings and challenge the occupational exclusions, geographic wages differentials, and other discriminatory devices embedded in early New Deal labor and employment laws, which functioned to exclude Black workers from coverage or assign them subminimum wages.

The NIL served as the nerve center of the JCNR, as well as its leading member organization. The JCNR movement organization network has 26 member organizations, including the YWCA, National Urban League (NUL), and the National Association for the Advancement of Colored People (NAACP). Davis served as the Executive Secretary of the NIL and JCNR, which shared administrative leadership. Harvard trained economist, Robert C. Weaver served as the Director of Research. George Edmund Haynes, sociologist and co-founder of the Urban League, served as NIL and JCNR Chairman. Nannie Burroughs, founder of the National Training School for Women and Girls, National Association of Wage Earners, International Council of Women of the Darker Races, and the National League of Republican Colored Women, served as NIL and JCNR treasurer.

Under Davis’ leadership, the JCNR worked to expose and counter the racism and discrimination underlying New Deal legislation, policies, and programs, and push for improved wages and working conditions for Black workers, as well as broader legislation that would improve the social, political, and economic position of Black workers and families. The JCNR called for a minimum wage for all workers set at a living wage that would increase in direct proportion to the cost of living and racially just, interracial, and democratic unionization. Davis and his colleagues advocated for agricultural, domestic, and other excluded workers to be covered by New Deal labor and social security protections. The JCNR also pushed for equitable treatment and an end to discriminatory policies and actions in the broad Public Works Administration, Homestead Subsistence, the Agricultural Adjustment Administration, and Emergency Relief Administration. Davis and the JCNR demanded Black representation in the NRA and its investigatory and enforcement efforts, as well as in other New Deal agencies and programs, the Labor Department, and the federal government.

Davis went on to use the JCNR as the foundation upon which to build an even larger movement organization network, the National NegroCongress (“NNC”).

== National Negro Congress ==
In May 1935, a conference on the economic status of the Negro was held at Howard University in Washington, D.C., out of which emerged a major civil rights coalition that was active in the late 1930s and 1940s: the National Negro Congress (NNC)—whose sponsors included Davis, Ralph J. Bunche and Alain Locke of Howard University, A. Philip Randolph of the Brotherhood of Sleeping Car Porters, James Ford of the Communist Party USA, Lester Granger and Elmer Carter of the Urban League, and Charles Hamilton Houston of the NAACP. Davis was one of the original founders; he served as Executive Secretary until 1942.

The NNC represented one of the first efforts of the 20th century to bring together under one umbrella black secular leaders, preachers, labor organizers, workers, businessmen, radicals, and professional politicians, with the assumption that the common denominator of race could weld together such divergent segments of black society. It was the Communist Party's effort to build support among activists in the black mainstream. The evolution of the NNC dramatized the growing convergence of outlook between Communists and activist black intellectuals that had taken shape in the protests of the early Depression years and reached full fruition during the years of the Popular Front.

In 1943, Davis brought the first lawsuit challenging segregated schools in Washington, D.C., in the name of his five-year-old son Michael D. Davis, who was rejected from his neighborhood's Noyes School, a white elementary school. The Washington Star newspaper criticized the African-American lawyer for legally challenging the District's dual segregated school system after the principal of Noyes School refused to admit Mike Davis. The Washington Star said that District citizens had long accepted separate schools for blacks and whites, and that the suit brought by John P. Davis would cause deeper racial divisions in the nation's capital.

In response to Davis' suit, the US Congress appropriated federal funds to construct the Lucy D. Slowe elementary school, for African-American children, directly across the street from his Brookland neighborhood home. At that time, a committee of Congress directly administered District government.

== Our World magazine ==
After World War II, in 1946 Davis was founding publisher of Our World magazine, a full-size, nationally distributed magazine to appeal to African-American readers. Its first issue, with singer-actress Lena Horne on the cover, appeared on the nation's newsstands in April 1946. Our World was a premier publication, covering contemporary topics from black history to sports and entertainment, with regular articles on health, fashion, politics and social awareness. It was based in New York City, the publishing capital of the country.

Our World portrayed a thriving black America; its covers featured entertainers such as Lena Horne, Marian Anderson, Harry Belafonte, Eartha Kitt, Ella Fitzgerald, Louis Armstrong, Duke Ellington and Nat King Cole. The magazine ceased publication in 1957.

== The American Negro Reference Book ==
In 1964, Davis served as editor of special publications for the Phelps-Stokes Fund. He compiled in a single volume a reliable summary on the main aspects of Negro life in America, presenting it with historical depth to provide the reader with a true perspective. The American Negro Reference Book covered virtually every aspect of African-American life, present and past.

== Papers and collections ==
The largest collection of Davis' papers is in the Schomburg Center for Research in Black Culture, New York Public Library. Insight into Davis' political and social views can be found in his own writings. The Papers of the National Negro Congress reproduces all of the organization's records that are housed at the Schomburg Center for Research in Black Culture, including the voluminous working files of Davis and successive executive secretaries of the National Negro Congress. Beginning with papers from 1933 that predate the formation of the National Negro Congress, the wide-ranging collection documents Davis’ involvement in the Negro Industrial League. It includes the "Report Files" of Davis’ interest in the "Negro problem."

Artifacts and papers of Davis are being acquired by the Smithsonian Institution's National Museum of African-American History and Culture.
