= Josiah Thomas (priest) =

Josiah Thomas (1760 - 1820) was Archdeacon of Bath from his installation on 26 April 1817 until his death on 27 May 1820.

Thomas was educated at St John's College, Cambridge. He was ordained deacon on 22 September 1782 and priest on 20 June 1784. He held incumbencies at St Merryn, Street, Somerset, Backwell, Kingston Deverill and Walcot, Bath.

== Notes ==
Church of England titles
Preceded by George Trevelyan	Archdeacon of Bath; 1817–1820	Succeeded by Charles Moysey
