= James Bonde =

The Venerable James Bond was an Anglican priest in England during the mid 16th Century.

Bond was educated at Magdalen College, Oxford, becoming a Fellow in 1539. He was appointed Fellow in 1564 and Praelector in 1578. He held livings at Shepton Mallet, Stogumber and Bridestowe. He was appointed a Canon Residentiary of Wells Cathedral in 1544 and Archdeacon of Bath in 1560, holding both posts until his death 25 November 1570.
