= Archdeacon of Bath =

Church of England ecclesiastical office

The Archdeacon of Bath is a senior ecclesiastical officer in the Church of England Diocese of Bath and Wells. The post, having oversight over the archdeaconry of Bath, has existed since the twelfth century. The archdeaconry includes five deaneries.

== List of archdeacons ==
Some archdeacons without territorial titles are recorded from around 1086; see Archdeacon of Wells.

=== High Medieval ===
- bef. 1100–aft. 1120: Gerbert
- bef. July 1141–aft. 1154: Martin
- aft. 1154–aft. 1165: Thomas (I)
- c. 1167: Baldwin
- c. 1167–bef. 1176: John Comyn
- bef. 1182–aft. 1206: Peter of Blois (also Archdeacon of London from 1202)
- c. 1208–aft. 1212: John of Colchester (disputed)
- bef. 1214–c. 1234 (d.): Hugh of Wells
- c. 1234–aft. 1236: Nicholas de Neville
- bef. 1238–aft. 1246: Henry Tessun
- bef. 1247–aft. 1248: Nicholas Tessun
- bef. 1257–1257 (res.): Robert de Chauncy (afterwards Bishop of Carlisle)
- bef. 1259–1259 (res.): John de Cheam (afterwards Bishop of Glasgow)
- bef. 1264–aft. 1266: Walter de Merton (also Lord Chancellor;

later Bishop of Rochester, 1274)

- bef. 1268–aft. 1269: Thomas (II)
- bef. 1277–aft. 1285: Ralph de Wicham/Wikham
- bef. 1292–aft. 1294: Thomas of Axbridge
- bef. 1295–bef. 1297: Iterius Bochard of Angoulême

=== Late Medieval ===
- 8 February 1309 – 1333 (d.): Henry of Sandwich
- c. 1333–29 September 1342 (exch.): Matthew de Valenciis
- 29 September 1342 – 1353 (d.): Walter de Hulle
- 7 March 1353–aft. 1366: John Power
- bef. 1380–1380: Hugh Herle
- 1380–bef. 1386: Ranulf de Gorce de Monterac
- 23 July 1386–bef. 1428 (res.): Roger Harewell
- 30 January 1428 – 10 December 1449 (exch.): Thomas Warde
- 10 December 1449–bef. 1460 (d.): William Sprever
- 26 February–May 1460 (res.): Hugh Sugar/Norris
- 6 May 1460–bef. 1497 (d.): Richard Lichefeld
- 17 March 1497 – 1498 (res.): William Cosyn (afterwards Dean of Wells)
- 31 March–July 1499 (res.): Thomas Beaumont (later Archdeacon of Wells)
- 12 July 1499 – 1502 (res.): John Pikman
- 4 September 1502 – 1518 (d.): Thomas Tomyow
- bef. 1535–17 October 1535 (d.): Robert Shorton
- bef. 1536–November 1557 (d.): Walter Cretyng

=== Early modern ===
- bef. 1561–aft. 1569: James Bonde
- 28 November 1570 – 1584 (res.): Tobias Matthew (afterwards Dean of Durham)
- 1 April 1584 – 12 March 1614 (d.): William Powell
- 18 April 1614 – 1 April 1638 (d.): Timothy Revett
- 2 April 1638 – 1643 (res.): William Piers (afterwards Archdeacon of Taunton)
- 30 December 1643–bef. 1661: William Davis
- 6 June 1661 – 23 June 1690 (d.): John Sellick
- 31 October 1690 – 11 December 1711 (d.): William Clement
- 31 December 1711 – 1733 (d.): William Hunt
- 5 September 1733 – 19 April 1743 (d.): Lawson Huddleston
- 21 May 1743 – 1761 (res.): Samuel Squire (also Dean of Bristol from 1760;

afterwards Bishop of St David's)

- 26 May 1761 – 1767 (res.): Thomas Camplin (afterwards Archdeacon of Taunton)
- 12 February 1768 – 25 July 1786 (d.): John Chapman
- 26 September 1786 – 18 July 1798 (d.): Edmund Lovell
- 28 July 1798 – 11 June 1815 (d.): James Phillott
- 22 July 1815 – 1817 (res.): George Trevelyan (afterwards Archdeacon of Taunton)
- 26 April 1817 – 27 May 1820 (d.): Josiah Thomas
- 17 June 1820–bef. 1839 (res.): Charles Moysey
- 6 March 1839 – 19 August 1852 (d.): William Brymer
- 17 September 1852 – 11 October 1860 (d.): William Gunning

=== Late modern ===
- 1860–1895: Robert William Browne
- 1895–1909: Hilton Bothamley
- 1909–29 September 1924 (d.): Lancelot Fish
- 1924–1938: Sydney Boyd
- 1938–1947: William Selwyn (afterwards Bishop suffragan of Fulham)
- 1947–1962: Edwin Cook
- 1962–1971: Arthur Hopley
- 1971–1975: Tom Baker (afterwards Dean of Worcester)
- 1975–1995: John Burgess
- 1996–2004: Bob Evens (afterwards Bishop suffragan of Crediton)
- May 2005 – 30 June 2017 (ret.): Andy Piggott
- 4 July – 5 November 2017: Chris Hare (acting)
- 5 November 2017 – June 2024 (res.): Adrian Youings
- 1 September 2024 – present: Charlie Peer

== Sources ==
- Greenway, Diana E. (2001), Fasti Ecclesiae Anglicanae 1066–1300, vol. 7, pp. 26–31
- Jones, B. (1964), Fasti Ecclesiae Anglicanae 1300–1541, vol. 8, pp. 14–15
- Horn, Joyce M. (1979), Fasti Ecclesiae Anglicanae 1541–1857, vol. 5, pp. 18–20
