= Hilton Bothamley =

Archdeacon of Bath

The Ven. Hilton Bothamley (26 August 1837 – 1 July 1919) was an English Anglican clergyman who was Archdeacon of Bath from 1895 to 1909.

Bothamley was born in Camberwell, Surrey, to Thomas Hilton Bothamley and Elizabeth Sarah, daughter of MP Robert Westley Hall-Dare. He was educated at Harrow and Trinity College, Cambridge. He was ordained in 1861 and began his career with a curacy at St John, Weymouth. He held incumbencies at St Nicholas, Peper Harow and St Stephen Landon Bath. He was a Prebendary of Wells Cathedral from 1892 to to 1913.

He died in 1919 in Bath.

Church of England titles
Preceded by Robert Browne	Archdeacon of Bath; 1895–1909	Succeeded by Lancelot Fish
