= William Powell (Archdeacon of Bath) =

English Anglican priest

William Powell was an Anglican priest in England during the late 16th and early 17th centuries.

Powell was educated at Magdalen College, Oxford. He was appointed Fellow in 1564 and Praelector in 1578. He held livings at St Mary, Reading and All Hallows, Bread Street in the City of London. He was appointed a Canon Residentiary of Wells Cathedral in 1583 and Archdeacon of Bath in 1584. Powell died on 12 March 1612, and is buried in the Quire of Wells Cathedral.
