= Lyndon LaRouche U.S. presidential campaigns =

1976–2004 American political campaigns

Lyndon LaRouche for President
- Campaign: 1976 United States presidential election 1980 Democratic Party presidential primaries 1984 Democratic Party presidential primaries 1988 Democratic Party presidential primaries 1992 Democratic Party presidential primaries 1996 Democratic Party presidential primaries 2000 Democratic Party presidential primaries 2004 Democratic Party presidential primaries 2016 United States presidential election
- Candidate: Lyndon LaRouche; Founder of the LaRouche movement R. Wayne Evans (1976); Billy Davis (1984); Debra Hanania Freeman (1988); James Bevel (1992)
- Affiliation: U.S. Labor Party (1976); Democratic Party (1980, 1984, 1988, 1992, 1996, 2000, 2004); Independent Democratic (1984); National Economic Recovery (1988); Democrats for Economic Recovery (1992); Write-in (2016)

Lyndon LaRouche's United States presidential campaigns were a controversial staple of American politics between 1976 and 2004. LaRouche ran for president on eight consecutive occasions, a record for any candidate, and tied Harold Stassen's record as a perennial candidate. LaRouche ran for the Democratic nomination for President of the United States seven times, beginning in 1980.

== Campaigns ==
=== 1976 ===
In 1971 LaRouche founded the U.S. Labor Party as a vehicle for electoral politics. In 1976 he ran for President of the United States as the U.S. Labor Party candidate, polling 40,043 votes (0.05%). According to LaRouche supporters, the major accomplishment of the campaign was the broadcast of a paid half-hour television address, which gave LaRouche the opportunity to air his views before a national audience. This was to become a regular feature of later campaigns during the 1980s and 1990s.

His platform included a reference to Vice President Nelson Rockefeller: "Impeach Rocky to prevent imminent nuclear war".

=== 1980 ===
Since the autumn of 1979, LaRouche resigned from the U.S. Labor Party and founded the National Democratic Policy Committee (NDPC), a political action committee whose name drew complaints from the Democratic National Committee, who saw these efforts as infiltration.

LaRouche budgeted $150,000 for the first primary state, New Hampshire. That included air time on TV stations in overlapping markets such as Maine and Vermont, along with 1,928 radio advertisements on New Hampshire radio. LaRouche reportedly spent $4,000 on a half-hour broadcast on WBZ, and a total of $24,200 on all TV spots in the state.

The Democratic National Committee asserted that LaRouche is not a Democrat, but the U.S. electoral system made it impossible for the party to prevent LaRouche followers entering Democratic primaries. LaRouche himself polled negligible vote totals, but continued to promote himself as a serious political candidate, a claim which was sometimes accepted by elements of the media and some political figures.

In the end, LaRouche got 177,784 (0.91%) votes in the primaries.

=== 1984 ===
LaRouche's 1984 campaign was his most successful, garnering over 76,000 votes. Independent Democrats for LaRouche, a committee formed for the 1984 election, was found guilty in 1988 of soliciting loans in violation of Minnesota securities law, and was ordered to stop selling unregistered Securities.

=== 1988 ===
In 1988 LaRouche and running mate Debra Hanania Freeman received 25,082 votes, or 0.03% of the vote.

=== 1992 ===
In 1992, LaRouche became the third person in U.S. history (after Joseph Smith and Eugene Debs) to run for president from a prison cell. Classical violinist Norbert Brainin performed a benefit concert on his behalf in Washington, D.C.; the Washington Post reviewer praised his musicianship while condemning his political message. LaRouche's running mate, who did the active campaigning, was the American Civil Rights Movement leader, Reverend James Bevel.

=== 1996 ===
Prior to the primaries the Chair of the Democratic National Committee, Don Fowler, ruled that LaRouche "is not to be considered a qualified candidate for nomination of the Democratic Party for President" on account of LaRouche's "expressed political beliefs, including beliefs which are explicitly racist and anti-Semitic, and otherwise utterly contrary to the fundamental beliefs ... of the Democratic Party and ... on his past activities including exploitation of and defrauding contributors and voters." In subsequent primaries LaRouche received enough votes in Louisiana and Virginia to get one delegate from each state. When the state parties refused to award the delegates LaRouche sued in federal court, claiming a violation of the Voting Rights Act. After losing in the district court the case was appealed to the First District Court of Appeals, which sustained the lower court.

In 1999, however, a court ruled that the Democratic National Committee had the right to keep LaRouche from electing delegates to the Democratic National Convention, based on a party requirement that a Democratic nominee must be a registered voter. LaRouche, as a convicted felon, was not eligible to be a registered voter in the state of Virginia, where he lived. (see United States v. LaRouche)

=== 2000 ===
A routine FEC audit of the 2000 "LaRouche's Committee for a New Bretton Woods" campaign found that vendors whose sole client was Lyndon LaRouche had added unqualified "mark-up charges" to the bill submitted for matching funds. The vendors were American System Publications, Inc., Eastern States Distributors, Inc., EIR News Services, Inc., Hamilton Systems Distributors, Inc., Mid-West Circulation Corp., Southeast Literature Sales, Inc., and Southwest Literature Distributors, Inc. They had overbilled by $241,519 and the campaign was ordered to repay $222,034. The FEC decision was affirmed by the U.S. Court of Appeals for the D.C. Circuit.

LaRouche qualified to win six delegates in the Arkansas Democratic primary. A minimum of 15% vote was required and LaRouche took 22%. However, the Democratic Party refused to grant him delegates because he was ineligible to vote.

=== 2004 ===
He waged a campaign, begun in October 2002, to have Dick Cheney dumped from the Republican ticket.

Again, LaRouche gained negligible electoral support. However, according to Federal Election Commission statistics, LaRouche had more individual contributors to his 2004 presidential campaign than any other candidate, until the final quarter of the primary season, when John Kerry surpassed him. As of the April 15 filing, LaRouche had 7834 individual contributions, of those who have given cumulatively, $200 or more, as compared to 6257 for John Kerry, 5582 for John Edwards, 4090 for Howard Dean, and 2744 for Dick Gephardt.

He ran even though his home state of Virginia is one of a handful of states which still has lifetime denial of the vote to felons, which can be overturned only on appeal to the governor. (Neither the Constitution nor federal statute law requires presidents to be registered voters.) The Democratic Party did not consider his candidacy to be legitimate and ruled him ineligible to win delegates. He gained negligible electoral support. He was endorsed by two Democratic state representatives, Erik Fleming of Mississippi and Harold James of Pennsylvania, though Fleming later called the endorsement "the worst mistake of all." LaRouche was not one of the major candidates invited to the primary-season debates, although he did participate in some alternative forums for minor candidates.

LaRouche was present in Boston during the 2004 Democratic National Convention but did not attend the convention itself. His followers sang songs insulting Democratic nominee John Kerry. Later in the campaign his followers heckled Kerry and disrupted his rallies.

He held a media conference in which he declared his support for John Kerry and pledged to mobilize his organization to help defeat George W. Bush in the November presidential election.

=== 2016 ===
On October 17, 2016, LaRouchePAC advised readers to write in Lyndon LaRouche and Alexander Hamilton in the 2016 Presidential elections. In the article "What We Need in 2016: — Alexander Hamilton's Principles, LaRouche's Four Laws", the PAC wrote "American citizens should write in LaRouche's name at the presidential ballot box to stand for the re-adoption of Alexander Hamilton's economic principles, as LaRouche has reclarified them. "I'm writing in LaRouche and Alexander Hamilton, let's get the nation to elect the right principles" will cut through the dread with which Americans are questioning each other about the approach of Election Day."

This exhortation was disseminated by PAC members through social media. No verifiable statistics have been assembled concerning vote totals.

== Campaign statistics ==
Lyndon LaRouche political statistics (amounts in USD)(* off year campaign activity)
Year	Party	Running mate	Total funds raised	Matching funds	Campaign debt	Primary votes	Sources
1976	Labor	Ronald Wayne Evans					
1980	Dem			$526,253		177,784	
1984	Dem	Billy Davis		$494,146			
1988	Dem	Debra Freeman		$825,577			
1992	Dem	James Bevel	$2,709,531	ineligible	$2,223,985		
1994*			$1,154,623		$2,124,099		
1996	Dem		$4,304,184	$624,692	$2,079,927	496,423	
1998*			$138,424		$2,051,489		
2000	Dem		$4,898,362	$1,448,389	$2,471,918	327,928	
2002*			$3,080,601		$2,360,261		
2004	Dem		$10,255,464	$1,456,019	$3,217,890		
Total since 1990			$23,814,604	$2,899,889	$18,881,195		

== Campaign committees ==
- 1976 – Committee to Elect Lyndon LaRouche (1976 Committee)
- 1980 – Citizens For LaRouche
- 1984 – Independent Democrats for LaRouche
- 1988 – Democrats For National Economic Recovery – LaRouche in 88
- 1992 – Democrats For Economic Recovery-LaRouche in 92
- 1996 – The Committee to Reverse the Accelerating Global Economic and Strategic Crisis: A LaRouche Exploratory Committee
- 2000 – LaRouche's Committee for a New Bretton Woods
- 2004 – LaRouche in 2004

Unknown years

- LaRouche Democratic Campaign
- Texas Democrats to Draft LaRouche
- LaRouche Campaign

== FEC cases ==
- Committee to Elect Lyndon LaRouche v. FEC; FEC v. Committee to Elect Lyndon LaRouche; Jones v. FEC
- Gelman v. FEC (80 1646)
- Gelman v. FEC (80 2471)
- Dolbeare v. FEC (No. 81 Civ. 4468-CLB)
- FEC v. Citizens for LaRouche;
- FEC v. LaRouche
- LaRouche v. State Board of Elections
- Spannaus v. FEC (85-0404)
- Spannaus v. FEC (91-0681)
- LaRouche v. FEC (92-1100)
- LaRouche v. FEC (92-1555)
- FEC v. LaRouche(94-0658)
- LaRouche's Committee for a New Bretton Woods v. FEC

=== FEC chronology 1979–1992 ===
(Adapted from material at the FEC website.)

- August 23, 1979 – U.S. Court of Appeals for the District of Columbia upholds the commission's action in denying primary matching fund payments to Lyndon LaRouche, a candidate of the U.S. Labor Party, during the 1976 presidential primary campaign. (613 F.2d 834 (D.C. Cir. 1979), cert. denied, 444 U.S. 1074 (1980).)
- December 18, 1979 – Lyndon LaRouche establishes eligibility to receive primary matching funds.
- February 19, 1980 – U.S. Supreme Court denies a petition for certiorari in three cases brought by Lyndon LaRouche and Leroy Jones against the commission. (444 U.S. 1074 (1980).)
- April 17, 1980 – Commission terminates the primary matching fund eligibility of Lyndon LaRouche.
- May 28, 1980 – Commission denies a request to re-establish matching fund eligibility for Lyndon LaRouche.
- July 22, 1980 – U.S. District Court of Appeals for the District of Columbia affirms the commission's determination that Lyndon LaRouche failed to re-establish matching fund eligibility. (Gelman v. FEC, 631 F.2d 939 (D.C. Cir.), cert. denied, 449 U.S. 876 (1980).)
- October 27, 1980 – U.S. District Court for the District of Columbia rules that FEC must notify Citizens for LaRouche Committee of investigations involving contributors to 1980 LaRouche campaign. (Gelman v. FEC, Civil Action No. 80-2471.)
- April 15, 1981 – Commission releases final audit report on Citizens for LaRouche (1980).
- March 11, 1982 – District Court for the Southern District of New York grants preliminary injunction to plaintiffs in Dolbeare v. FEC, in which plaintiffs challenged FEC investigations of the 1980 presidential primary campaign of Lyndon LaRouche. (No. 81 Civ. 4468-CLB (S.D.N.Y. Mar. 9, 1982)(unpublished opinion).) The LaRouche campaign alleged that the FEC had launched investigations to harass the campaign, producing a "chilling effect on the free association rights of the campaign's contributors," and that the FEC had gone beyond the prescribed scope of its investigations. The U.S. District Court for the Southern District of New York barred the FEC from initiating any more investigations into the LaRouche campaign's 1980 presidential primary activities until the pending enforcement actions were concluded, and auditing, or issuing depositions to, LaRouche campaign contributors unless the FEC simultaneously notified the LaRouche campaign of such actions.
- January 26, 1984 – Commission initially determines Democratic candidate Lyndon LaRouche ineligible for 1984 primary matching funds, based on violations involving his 1980 campaign.
- April 12, 1984 – Lyndon LaRouche establishes eligibility to receive primary matching funds.
- July 7, 1984 – Lyndon LaRouche becomes ineligible for matching funds.
- October 29, 1985 – Commission releases audit report on 1984 presidential primary campaign of Lyndon LaRouche.
- March 24, 1988 – Lyndon H. LaRouche establishes eligibility to receive primary matching funds.
- May 23, 1990 – FEC releases final audit report on LaRouche Democratic Campaign.
- October 3, 1990 – LaRouche committee makes oral presentation contesting FEC audit report.
- December 19, 1991 – Commission denies Lyndon LaRouche's eligibility to receive primary matching funds.
- February 27, 1992 – FEC makes final determination denying matching funds to Lyndon LaRouche, for his 1992 presidential campaign.
- March 3, 1992 – Lyndon LaRouche and his campaign committee ask the U.S. Court of Appeals for the D.C. Circuit to review the commission's decision to deny the campaign matching funds. (LaRouche v. FEC (No. 921100).)
- September 17, 1992 – FEC makes final determination that the LaRouche Democratic Campaign repay $151,260 in federal funds for 1988 campaign.
- October 22, 1992 – Lyndon LaRouche and LaRouche Democratic Campaign '88 petition U.S. Court of Appeals for the D.C. Circuit to review the commission's final repayment determination.

=== Other FEC cases ===
In 2004, the FEC dismissed a complaint filed by LaRouche associate Barbara M. Boyd against LaRouche Watch, an online forum, and Red Letter Press, a publishing house affiliated with the Freedom Socialist Party. The Commission found "no reason to believe" that the forum was a political action committee, or that it was subsidized by Red Letter Press, as alleged by Boyd.

== See also ==
- Political views of Lyndon LaRouche
- LaRouche movement (includes information on other political organizing)
