= William A. Davis Jr. =

Dr. William A. Davis Jr.
- Born: William Ames Davis Jr. July 9, 1927
- Died: May 4, 2017 (aged 89)
- Citizenship: United States of America
- Education: Vanderbilt University, Massachusetts Institute of Technology, Southeastern Institute of Technology

William Ames Davis Jr. (July 9, 1927 – May 4, 2017) was an engineer and distinguished leader in Ballistic Missile Defense (BMD) for the United States Army at Redstone Arsenal in Huntsville, Alabama. Davis was an inaugural member of the United States Senior Executive Service (SES) and recipient of numerous accolades and awards from the army, including the Meritorious Civilian Service Award (1980) and the Department of the Army Decoration for Exceptional Civilian Service (1982).

== Career ==
Davis served most notably as director of the U.S. Army Advanced Ballistic Missile Defense Agency (ABMDA) from 1967 to 1971, director of the Ballistic Missile Defense Advanced Technology Center (BMDATC) from 1971 to 1977, the deputy Ballistic Missile Defense (BMD) program manager (SES, senior civilian for U.S. Army BMD programs and management of Kwajalein Missile Range) from 1977 to 1982, and; after retiring from civilian service; Vice President of Space Defense at Teledyne Brown Engineering from 1982 to 1986. Davis held a Bachelor of Engineering degree and status as a distinguished alumnus from the Vanderbilt University School of Engineering, a Sloan Fellowship leading to a Master of Science degree from the Massachusetts Institute of Technology (MIT), and an honorary PhD from the Southeastern Institute of Technology. Before assuming his civilian leadership roles, Davis served in the United States Army Signal Corps from 1945 to 1947 in Japan, following World War II, as a staff sergeant. After leaving the army to pursue higher education and earning his B.E. from Vanderbilt University in only three years, Davis assumed his first civilian role as a test engineer for the United States Navy at Charleston Naval Shipyard. Following his time in Charleston, South Carolina, Davis assumed a role as an engineer for the army at Redstone Arsenal, where he worked as an industrial engineer for guided missiles and a project engineer for the HAWK air defense system R&D program, eventually leading some of the army's first research and development efforts in high-energy lasers. After completing the Sloan Fellowship Program at MIT in 1967, Davis lead systems analysis groups and programs for the United States Army Missile Command and the United States Army Advanced Ballistic Missile Defense Agency (ABMDA) including national policy level studies of BMD systems for Minuteman Intercontinental Ballistic Missile (ICBM) defense, eventually moving into the role as director of ABMDA. In 1984, Davis contributed a chapter on BMD to Ash Carter's (United States Secretary of Defense under President Obama) book Ballistic Missile Defense, a topic in which Carter championed throughout his career. Following his leadership roles with the United States Army and Teledyne Brown Engineering in 1986, Davis continued to serve as an esteemed independent consultant until the early 2010s (decade) when he began suffering from the advanced stage effects of Alzheimer's disease. Davis died on May 4, 2017, under care at the Floyd E. "Tut" Fann State Veterans Home in Huntsville, Alabama.

Davis is featured on the Air, Space, and Missile Defense Association Wall of Honor at the U.S. Space & Rocket Center.
