= John Sellick =

English priest

John Sellick (1609–1690) was an English priest in the 17th century.

Sellick was educated at Christ Church, Oxford. He held livings at Elworthy and Clifton Campville. He was Archdeacon of Bath from 1661 until his death on 30 June 1690.
