= Brian Arthur Sellick =

British anaesthetist (1918-1996)

- Born: 13 June 1918; Surrey, United Kingdom.
- Died: 13 July 1996 (aged 78); London, United Kingdom.
- Scientific career
- Fields: anaesthetist

Brian Arthur Sellick (1918–1996) was a British anaesthetist. He was known for cricoid pressure, he described in 1961. This manoeuvre is named after him.

Sellick worked as an anaesthetist at Middlesex Hospital. There he demonstrated the efficacy of his invention using a cadaver with full stomach placed in the Trendelenburg position.

== See also ==
- Cricoid pressure
- Rapid sequence induction
