= Lawson Huddleston =

English priest

Lawson Huddleston (1677–1743) was an English priest.

Huddleston was educated at Jesus College, Oxford. He held livings at St Nicholas, Kelston and St Cuthbert, Wells. He was Archdeacon of Bath from 1733 until his death on 19 April 1743.
