= William C. Davis (American football) =

American football player, coach, and executive (1938–2020)

Biographical details
- Born: July 21, 1938; Youngstown, Ohio, U.S.
- Died: January 18, 2020 (aged 81); Estero, Florida, U.S.

Playing career
- c. 1959: Mount Union
- Positions: Quarterback, defensive back

Coaching career (HC unless noted)
- 1964–1966: Austintown Fitch HS (OH)
- 1967: Westminster (PA) (assistant)
- 1968–1972: Adrian
- 1973–1975: Michigan State (off. backs)
- 1976–1978: Philadelphia Eagles (TE)

Administrative career (AD unless noted)
- 1979–1981: Miami Dolphins (dir. pro pers.)
- 1981–1986: Cleveland Browns (VP player pers.)
- 1986–1990: Philadelphia Eagles (VP player pers.)

Head coaching record
- Overall: 20–24 (college); 18–8–1 (high school)

Accomplishments and honors

Championships
- 3 MIAA (1970–1972)

William C. Davis Sr. (July 21, 1938 – January 18, 2020) was an American football player, coach, and executive. He served as the head football coach at Adrian College in Adrian, Michigan for five seasons, from 1968 to 1972, compiling a record of 20–24. He was later director of pro personnel for the National Football League (NFL) Miami Dolphins, vice president of player personnel for the Cleveland Browns, and vice president of player personnel for the Philadelphia Eagles. On January 18, 2020, Davis died at the age of 81 from Alzheimer's disease.

Davis' son, Billy, is an assistant coach for the Arizona Cardinals of the NFL.

== Head coaching record ==
=== College ===
Year	Team	Overall	Conference	Standing	Bowl/playoffs
Adrian Bulldogs (Michigan Intercollegiate Athletic Association) (1968–1972)
1968	Adrian	1–7	1–4	T–5th	
1969	Adrian	3–6	0–5	6th	
1970	Adrian	6–3	4–1	T–1st	
1971	Adrian	5–4	4–1	T–1st	
1972	Adrian	5–4	4–1	T–1st	
Adrian:		20–24	13–12		
Total:		20–24			
National championship Conference title Conference division title or championship game berth
