= Billy Davis (American football coach) =

American football player and coach (born 1965)

Bill Davis
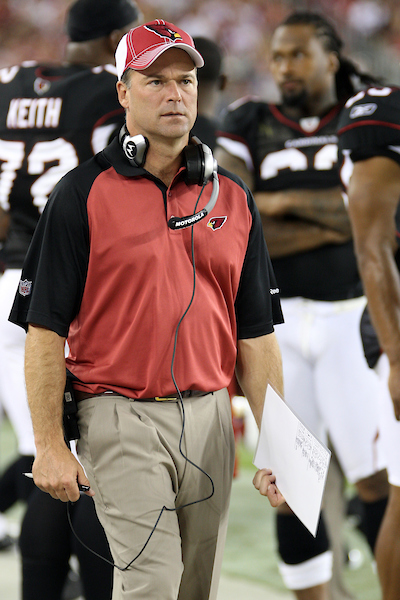
- Davis in 2010

Houston Texans
- Title: Linebackers coach

Personal information
- Born: November 5, 1965 (age 61); Youngstown, Ohio, U.S.

Career information
- Positions: Quarterback, wide receiver
- College: Cincinnati (1985-1988)

Career history
- Michigan State (1991) Graduate assistant; Pittsburgh Steelers (1992–1994) Defensive assistant; Carolina Panthers (1995–1998) Outside linebackers coach; Cleveland Browns (1999) Assistant linebackers coach; Green Bay Packers (2000) Assistant defensive line coach; Atlanta Falcons (2001–2003) Linebackers coach; New York Giants (2004) Linebackers coach; San Francisco 49ers (2005–2006) Defensive coordinator; Arizona Cardinals (2007–2008) Linebackers coach; Arizona Cardinals (2009–2010) Defensive coordinator; Cleveland Browns (2011–2012) Linebackers coach; Philadelphia Eagles (2013–2015) Defensive coordinator; Ohio State (2017–2018) Linebackers coach; Arizona Cardinals (2019–2022) Linebackers coach; Houston Texans (2024–present) Linebackers coach
- Coaching profile at Pro Football Reference

Bill Davis (born November 5, 1965) is an American football coach who is the linebackers coach for the Houston Texans of the National Football League (NFL).

A 27-year NFL coach, Davis has coached linebackers for 14 seasons in the NFL, with the Carolina Panthers, Atlanta Falcons, New York Giants, Arizona Cardinals and Cleveland Browns. During his 14 years coaching linebackers, Davis coached outside linebackers for 4 years, inside linebackers for 4 years and the remaining 6 years Davis coached both inside and outside linebackers, having control of the entire unit. Davis also has 7 years of defensive coordinating experience for the San Francisco 49ers (2005-2006), the Arizona Cardinals (2009-10) and the Philadelphia Eagles.

Davis was a member of Ken Whisenhunt’s Arizona Cardinals staff in 2008 when the team advanced to Super Bowl XLIII and played Pittsburgh.

== Early life ==
Davis was born on November 5, 1965, in Youngstown, Ohio. His father, Bill Davis, coached in the NFL for 13 years, included the six years he was the Cleveland Browns' Vice President of Player Personnel. As a youth, Davis was hired to be a ball boy for Dick Vermeil in Philadelphia and Don Shula in Miami.

== College years ==
Davis attended the University of Cincinnati and was a quarterback and wide receiver on the football team from 1985 to 1988. Davis met Urban Meyer during this time and was the best man in his wedding.

== Coaching career ==
=== Michigan State ===
Davis began his football coaching career as a graduate assistant for the Michigan State Spartans.

=== Pittsburgh Steelers ===
In 1992, Davis entered the NFL as the defensive assistant for the Pittsburgh Steelers. For most of his football career, Davis had played and coached on the Offensive side of the ball, but under head coach Bill Cowher, Davis coached the Pittsburgh defense for three years.

=== Carolina Panthers ===
In 1995, under coach Dom Capers, Davis spent four years with the newly created Carolina Panthers. In his second year with Carolina, linebacker Kevin Greene finished first in the NFL in sacks with 14.5, and Lamar Lathon finished second in the NFL in sacks with 13.5. Both linebackers went to the Pro Bowl that year.

=== Cleveland Browns ===
In 1999, Davis spent a year as a defensive assistant and linebackers coach with the Cleveland Browns.

=== Green Bay Packers ===
In 2000, Davis went to the Green Bay Packers where he spent the year as a defensive assistant and line coach.

=== Atlanta Falcons ===
Davis then went to the Atlanta Falcons in 2001, where he spent the next three seasons as the linebackers coach under Dan Reeves. Davis helped then defensive coordinator Wade Phillips implement his new 3-4 defense. During Davis' three years at Atlanta, linebacker Keith Brooking went to the Pro Bowl each year and had over 100 tackles for 3 consecutive seasons with his career best of 127 tackles.

=== New York Giants ===
Davis was the New York Giants linebackers coach in 2004. Davis coached both Carlos Emmons and Kevin Lewis with both posting their career best 100 plus tackles. According to defensive coordinator Tim Lewis, Bill commanded the room whenever speaking to players and compiled blitz packages, a job usually done by the defensive coordinator.

=== San Francisco 49ers ===
On February 6, 2005, Davis was hired by San Francisco 49ers head coach Mike Nolan to be the defensive coordinator on the team after a six-hour interview. One of the reasons Davis got the job was because he had experience with the 3-4 defense that Nolan wanted to implement in San Francisco's defense and a recommendation Nolan got from New York Giants DC Tim Lewis. While he did not take play-calling duties, several players performed well in his tenure. Cornerback Walt Harris was selected to his first Pro Bowl in 2006 after his NFC-best 8 interceptions including one returned for a touchdown. Harris also led San Francisco with 5 forced fumbles and 2 fumble recoveries. Linebacker Brandon Moore had a breakout season as well, posting a career-high 114 tackles and leading the team with 6.5 sacks.

=== Arizona Cardinals ===
In 2007, Davis was hired by the Arizona Cardinals as their linebackers coach under head coach Ken Whisenhunt. In 2007 Davis coached Calvin Pace to a career- best over 100 tackles and career-high 6.5 sacks, which led Pace to sign the highest linebacker free agent contract of that season. In 2008, the Cardinals advanced to Super Bowl XLIII but ended up losing to the Steelers 23–27. In 2007 and 2008 both Karlos Dansby and Gerald Hayes eclipsed 100 tackles each year, with Dansby leading the team in 2007 (117 tackles) and setting a new career-best in 2008 (128 tackles). Hayes posted 107 tackles in 2008, marking the second consecutive season under Davis that he recorded 100 plus tackles. In 2009, Davis was promoted to defensive coordinator. His unit allowed 325 points, the 5th lowest total of the franchise since the NFL went to a 16 game schedule in 1978. The Cardinals also has 21 interceptions during the regular season, the team's highest total since 1994. Arizona defense finished 6th in the NFL with 43 sacks, the 3rd highest total since 1983. Safety Adrian Wilson, defensive tackle Darnell Dockett, safety Antrel Rolle and cornerback Dominique Rodgers-Cromartie were all selected to the Pro Bowl for that season. The Cardinals ultimately lost in the divisional round to the New Orleans Saints, who went on to win the Super Bowl.

=== Cleveland Browns ===
On January 31, 2011, Davis was hired by the Cleveland Browns as their linebackers coach. In 2011-2012, while at the Cleveland Browns, linebacker D'Qwell Jackson also posted consecutive 100 plus tackle seasons with a career best 149 tackles in 2011. Paired with Davis's coaching, in addition to his 149 career best tackles, Jackson earned his 1st Pro Bowl alternate selection.

=== Philadelphia Eagles ===
On February 7, 2013, Davis was hired by the Philadelphia Eagles as their defensive coordinator under head coach Chip Kelly. Under Davis, in 2014, the Eagles defense tied for 2nd in the NFL for sacks (49), ranked 5th in rush yards per attempt and tied for 6th in takeaways (28), including an NFL high 23 forced fumbles. In 2014, Connor Barwin was selected to his first Pro Bowl appearance. In 2015, DT Fletcher Cox and S Malcolm Jenkins were both selected to the Pro Bowl, despite the team rank of 31st in pass TD's allowed and 32nd in rushing yards allowed. Following that season, Fletcher Cox, Malcolm Jenkins and Mychal Kendricks all signed their highest contracts of their careers.

On January 19, 2016, Davis was not retained after new head coach Doug Pederson hired Jim Schwartz to replace him.

=== Ohio State ===
In December 2016, Davis was hired by Ohio State as their linebackers coach. All of Davis's starting linebackers have had opportunities in the NFL. Chris Worley (Cincinnati Bengals), Jerome Baker (Miami Dolphins), Dante Booker (Arizona Cardinals) and Malik Harrison (Baltimore Ravens). During his two seasons, Ohio State finished 25-3 winning two Big 10 Championship Games.

=== Arizona Cardinals (second stint) ===
On January 11, 2019, Davis was hired by the Arizona Cardinals as their linebackers coach under defensive coordinator Vance Joseph and head coach Kliff Kingsbury. In 2019, linebacker Jordan Hicks recorded a career best 150 tackles, 3rd highest in the NFL for the 2019 season. Hicks also had an NFL best, 9 games with 10 or more tackles. In the 2019 also, Davis coached Chandler Jones to a career best/franchise record 19 sacks, 8 forced fumbles and 7 strip-sacks season earning Jones the First Team All Pro and Pro Bowl selection. Jones was also named the NFC Defensive Player of the Year and runner up for the NFL Defensive Player of the Year.In 2020, both Jordan Hicks and De'Vondre Campbell eclipsed 100 plus tackles for the 2020 season.

=== Houston Texans ===
On February 28, 2024, the Texans hired Davis to be their new linebacker coach replacing Chris Kiffin.

== Personal life ==
Bill Davis lives with his wife, Sherry, and they are the parents of five children: Monica, Brooke, twins Grace and Ava and son Billy.
