= Robin Sellick =

Australian portrait photographer

Robin Sellick (born 1967) is an Australian portrait photographer, widely regarded as "Australia's leading celebrity photographer".

== Early life ==
The son of a miner, Sellick was born in Broken Hill in outback NSW, Australia, where, as a teenager, he gained a reputation as a "dog photographer", taking portraits of people's pets for free, before graduating to wedding portraits after moving to Adelaide in 1988. It was here, while working at a wedding portrait studio, that Sellick mistakenly developed slide film in chemicals meant for print, and thus became an accidental pioneer of cross processing, the exaggerated colours that result from the process becoming Sellick's trademark in coming years. In 1990, his exploration of this method saw him become the first person to win both of the highest awards for portraiture in Australia in the same year through the Australian Institute of Professional Photography, a feat he was to repeat the following year.

In 1992, Sellick was awarded a perfect score at the prominent 101st International Exhibition of Professional Photography in Chicago, and, that same year, used funds from a Young Achiever Award and a Queen Elizabeth II Silver Jubilee Grant to travel to New York, where he would subsequently work as an assistant for Annie Leibovitz, Mark Seliger and Mary Ellen Mark.

== Career ==
Returning to Australia in 1994, Sellick rose to commercial prominence in the burgeoning Australian magazine market, his portraits appearing regularly in magazines such as Vogue, Marie Claire, Who Weekly and Australian Style. He was instrumental in developing a new visual aesthetic for Who Weekly as it transformed into a glossy, full-colour magazine, and his style became influential as Australia's magazine market became more sophisticated. Sellick's work has also been published internationally, appearing on the cover of magazines such as Q, NME and German Rolling Stone.

A notable campaigner against what he refers to as "the vigorous pursuit of mediocrity" in Australian photography and its commercial industry (in 1995, he notoriously told Nancy Pilcher, then editor of Vogue Australia, that her magazine was "an international embarrassment", and never worked for Vogue again), Sellick is outspoken on the "lack of identity" in Australian photography.

"In Australia, magazine photographers do one of two things: they endeavour to make photographs which resemble, as closely as possible, photographs they've seen taken by other photographers in Europe or America, otherwise known as plagiarism; and those not blessed with even that much talent choose to make photographs which will never inspire or offend anyone in any way."

- Excerpt from a speech by Robin Sellick at the National Portrait Gallery, August 2009.

== Exhibitions ==
Sellick's first major public exhibition, "Celebrity", held at Crown Casino in Melbourne in 2006, was the highest-attended event at the casino in that year. It was also the first major exhibition of celebrity portraiture by an Australian photographer outside of the National Portrait Gallery.

The following year, Crown Casino invited Sellick back, the subsequent exhibition, "Exposing Robin Sellick", broking attendance records for the year 2007.

== Books ==
Sellick's first book, Facing, was published in Australia in 2004 and launched at the National Portrait Gallery in Canberra.

Sellick's next book, Life & Times in the Republic of Broken Hill, a collaboration with author Jack Marx released in 2011, was something of "an antidote" to his career as a celebrity photographer, the subjects of the portraits being ordinary people from the historic mining town.

== Awards ==
Australian Institute of Professional Photography's Don Taylor Award and Townsend Award - 1990 and 1991. Sellick was the first to win both awards at the same time. 101st International Exhibition of Professional Photography perfect score - 1992. Sellick's was the first perfect score in four years, and he was the first Australian to achieve this result.
