= William Brymer (priest) =

Archdeacon of Bath from 1840 to 1852

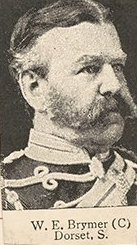

William Thomas Parr Brymer (1796 – 19 August 1852) was Archdeacon of Bath from his installation on 1 April 1840 until his death on 19 August 1852.

The son of a colonial administrator, Brymer was educated at Trinity College, Cambridge. He was Rector of Charlton Mackrell; and a Canon (priest) of the Cathedral Church of Wells.

== Notes ==
Church of England titles
Preceded by Charles Moysey	Archdeacon of Bath; 1840–1852	Succeeded by William Gunning
