= Arthur Hopley =

Arthur Hopley (17 October 1906 – 25 September 1981) was a senior Anglican priest in the second half of the twentieth century.

Hopley was educated at the Sir George Monoux Grammar and Wells Theological College. His first post was a curacy at St Mark, Bath. He was Rector of Claverton from 1944 to 1950; Vicar of Chard from 1950 to 1962; Archdeacon of Bath from 1962 to 1971; and Archdeacon of Taunton from 1971 to 1977.
