= Southeastern Institute of Technology =

Coordinates: 34°43′21.9″N 86°36′54.1″W

Southeastern Institute of Technology (SIT), Huntsville, Alabama, was a professional school from 1976 to 2004 providing continuing education and granting professional degrees focusing on application.

== Origin and History ==
SIT was formed in 1976 as a private, not-for-profit, professional school under the provisions of Title 10 of the Code of Alabama. Its purpose was to provide professional-level continuing education and graduate degree programs in engineering, management, and applied science for career advancement, updating, and redirection.

Southeastern Institute of Technology was then planned as a stand-alone professional school, with the purpose of meeting the special needs of this high-technology community. The planners included individuals who had previously been involved in the graduate programs and continuing education then available in Huntsville, and understood the potential students as well as the shortcomings of the existing offerings. SIT opened in September 1976, and awarded its first master's degrees in August 1977.

By 2004, the SIT Board decided that the original purpose of the school was no longer valid and duplication of effort was not in the community's best interest. SIT was placed in an inactive status, not accepting new students or offering classroom courses.

== Terms, Credits, and Grading ==
Instruction was given in eight-week periods, designated "Terms" (i.e., Early Fall Term, Winter Term, etc.). With six terms in a school year, only four weeks of off-time was available. Classes usually met twice weekly in the late afternoon or early evening, or on Saturdays. This schedule was designed for part-time students, allowing progress toward a degree while pursuing one course at a time.

Credit for course completion was expressed in "Units," the equivalent of Semester Hours. Most courses were available for 3 Units, and met for 40 class hours of 50 minutes each. Courses taken on a non-credit basis were awarded the standard Continuing Education Units (CEUs).

Grading was High Pass, Pass, Low Pass, and Unsatisfactory, earning 4, 3, 2, and 0 Quality Points respectively.

== Facilities ==
The main facilities for SIT were in a commercial office building in the Cummings Research Park. These included the administrative offices, classrooms, a computer laboratory, and a library with some 10,000 volumes and hundreds of journal and magazine series.

The Center for Applied Research was a subsidiary of SIT. Adjacent to the main facility, this was used for contracted research.

SIT had a facility clearance and was eligible to conduct classified instruction and research. Classified courses, however, were conducted in government facilities.

During the 1980s, SIT had an instructional activity in South Africa. Also, support was given under a government subcontract to activities in Egypt.
