= Abraham Lincoln DeMond =

Abraham Lincoln DeMond (June 6, 1867 – January 19, 1936) was an American minister and advocate for African-American emancipation in the late 19th and early 20th centuries. On January 1, 1900, at Dexter Avenue Baptist Church, he gave a speech, The Negro Element in American Life, which was his only published work.

He was the first black graduate of the State Normal School at Cortland, New York now known as SUNY Cortland, and later studied theology at Howard University. DeMond served as a pastor in Fort Payne, Alabama, Dexter Avenue Baptist Church in Montgomery, Alabama, Plymouth Congregational Church of Charleston, South Carolina, the First Congregational Church of Buxton, Iowa, and the First Congregational Church of New Orleans.

== Early life ==
Born in 1867 in Covert, Seneca County, New York, DeMond was the son of Quam and Phebe (Cuffe Darrow) DeMond. After graduating from Howard University Seminary, he was called to pastorates in New Orleans, Charleston, South Carolina, Montgomery, Alabama and Memphis, Tennessee. He married Lula Watkins Patterson, a Selma University graduate and music teacher. They had five children, all born between 1902 and 1908: teacher Ruth DeMond Brooks, Albert Laurence DeMond, William Arthur DeMond, Charles Gordon DeMond, and Marguerite Lula DeMond (wife of journalist John P. Davis).

== Pastoral life ==
The Negro Element in American Life was A. L. DeMond's most important contribution to history. He delivered his oration to members of the Dexter Avenue Baptist Church, Montgomery, Alabama, on January 1, 1900.

The Dexter Avenue Baptist Church later in the early 1960s became known as the church from which Dr. Martin Luther King Jr. led the Civil Rights Movement. It is today a National Historic Landmark. The Emancipation Proclamation Association, which published DeMond's speech, was one of several African-American social and beneficent organizations in the US South. William Watkins, who offered the resolution to publish the speech, was a contractor and lay leader of the congregation and responsible for building much of the church.

In his speech, DeMond reviews African-American history as a map for the American nation's future. He identifies the Declaration of Independence and the Emancipation Proclamation as the twin pillars of the American Republic, the latter constituting fulfillment of the former. he said that the Emancipation Proclamation enabled African Americans to join in loyal patriotism, and he lauds the participation of black soldiers in the Spanish–American War. He pays tribute to such antislavery figures as Douglass, Garnet, Garrison, Phillips, Beecher, Stowe, Whittier, Lowell, Longfellow, and Sumner for voicing a desire for freedom that informed the re-fashioning of the United States. He thought that American history was informed by three basic characters: "the Cavalier, the Puritan and the Negro." He praised African Americans for contributing "all that is noblest and best in American life." He incorporate rhetoric of the antislavery movement into early 20th-century nationalist discourse on freedom and the destiny of the United States.

The first of January was a day of celebration for African Americans who commemorated the day that President Lincoln's Emancipation Proclamation went into effect. The Emancipation Proclamation Association sponsored publishing DeMond's speech as a pamphlet. DeMond emphasizes that African Americans are fully American, not African, and therefore fully deserving of all the rights of citizens. DeMond describes the Declaration of Independence and the Emancipation Proclamation as:

"two great patriotic, wise and humane state papers…Both were born in days of doubt and darkness. Both were the outcome of injustice overleaping the bounds of right and reason. The one was essential to the fulfilling of the other. Without the Declaration of Independence the nation could not have been born; without the Emancipation Proclamation it could not have lived."

=== Buxton, Iowa ===
DeMond was a minister in Buxton, Iowa, in the early 20th century. It was an unusual community in the United States heartland. Originally established by the Consolidation Coal Company as a company town, Buxton was the largest unincorporated coal-mining community in Iowa. What made Buxton unique was that the majority of its five thousand residents were African Americans, a highly unusual racial composition for a state that was over 90 percent white.

At a time when both southern and northern blacks were disadvantaged in different ways, blacks in Buxton enjoyed steady employment, above-average wages, decent housing, and minimal discrimination. For such reasons, Buxton was commonly known as "the black man's utopia in Iowa."
