= William Clement (priest) =

English priest

William Clement was an English priest.

Clement was born in Mere, Wiltshire and educated at Christ Church, Oxford. Clement was Rector of Dauntsey from 1674, Master of St John's Hospital, Bath from 1684, and then a Canon of Wells and Prebendary of Ilton in the Diocese of Bath and Wells from 1689. Clement was Archdeacon of Bath from his appointment on 31 October 1690 until his death on 11 December 1711.
