= William Davis (priest) =

English priest

William Davis was an English priest in the 17th century.

Davis was educated at the University of Oxford. He became Vicar of Chard in 1642 and canon of Wells Cathedral in 1642; and Archdeacon of Bath in 1643.
