= Tom Baker (priest) =

British priest (1920–2000)

Thomas George Adames Baker (called Tom; 22 December 1920 – 25 September 2000) was an Anglican priest in the second half of the 20th century. He served as Dean of Worcester from 1975 to 1986.

Baker was born in Southampton. He was educated at King Edward VI School, Southampton and Exeter College, Oxford and ordained in 1945. His first post was as a curate at All Saints, King's Heath after which he was Vicar of St James' Church, Edgbaston. He was then Sub-Warden of Lincoln Theological College then Principal of Wells Theological College. In 1971 he became Archdeacon of Bath and four years later was appointed to the deanery of Worcester Cathedral where he served until 1986.

Church of England titles
Preceded by Eric Kemp	Dean of Worcester; 1975–1986	Succeeded by Bob Jeffery
