= William Selwyn (bishop) =

Anglican suffragan bishop

William Marshall Selwyn (15 February 1879 – 29 September 1951) was an Anglican suffragan bishop in the 20th century.

Selwyn was born into an ecclesiastical family, the second son of the Reverend Sydney Augustus Selwyn, of Boscombe vicarage, Bournemouth, and Ellen Blake. He was educated at Haileybury and Emmanuel College, Cambridge, before beginning his ordained ministry as a curate at All Saints' South Lambeth.

He was Chaplain of the London Irish Rifles from 1912 to 1917, a period that involved World War I, and was interviewed early in 1918 for a commission as a Temporary Chaplain to the Forces. He was described as 'A man', was appointed and sent to France. He was attached to several cavalry brigades and a Field Ambulance, and ended the War as Chaplain of the 2nd Cavalry Division.

Following this he was Chaplain of the British Embassy Church in Paris. Incumbencies as vicar at Holy Trinity, Bournemouth and Brompton, London followed before becoming the Archdeacon of Bath. He was also Rector of St Anne and St Agnes, Gresham Street In 1947 he was ordained to the episcopate as the second Bishop of Fulham, a post he was to hold for only two years. He died on 29 September 1951, aged 72.

Church of England titles
Preceded by Staunton Batty	Bishop of Fulham; 1947–1949	Succeeded by George Ingle
