= William H. Davis (Pennsylvania state representative) =

American politician (circa 1854)

William H. Davis was an American politician.

He served in the Pennsylvania House of Representatives in 1854, as a Democrat from Crawford County.
