= Billy Davis (Mississippi politician) =

American politician

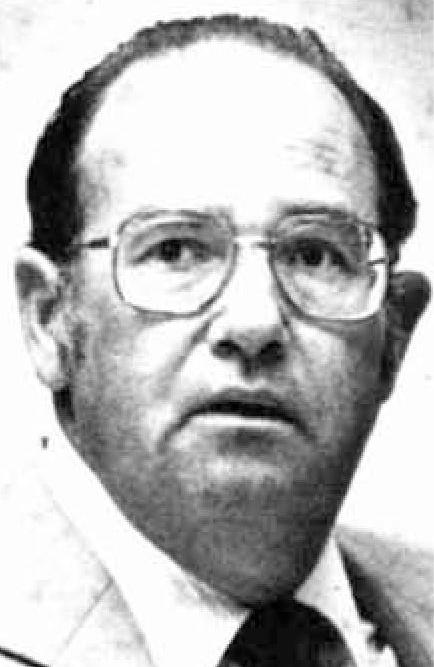

Independent candidate for Vice President of the United States
- Running mate: Lyndon LaRouche
- Opponent(s): Ronald Reagan (R), Walter Mondale (D) and numerous others.

Personal details
- Born: 1938 (age 87–88)
- Party: Independent

Billy M. Davis (born 1938) is a family farmer and attorney from Laurel, Mississippi associated with perennial candidate Lyndon LaRouche. Davis ran on the LaRouche platform for Governor of Mississippi in 1983. In the 1984 presidential election, Davis served as LaRouche's running mate. After an unsuccessful bid for the Democratic Party nomination, they ran as independents in the general election.
