= William Henry Davis =

American official (1872–1951)

- Born: February 18, 1872; Louisville, Kentucky, U.S.
- Died: January 7, 1951 (aged 78)
- Resting place: Lincoln Memorial Cemetery
- Education: Louisville Colored High School; Howard University (PharmD, 1902)
- Occupation: Bureaucrat
- Spouse: Julia B. Hubbard
- Children: John P. Davis

William Henry Davis (February 18, 1872 – January 7, 1951) was an educator, pharmacist, and a United States government official. In the Woodrow Wilson administration he was appointed as a special assistant to the Secretary of War, the highest position of any African American in the national government.

== Early life and education ==
Davis was born in Louisville, Kentucky, on February 18, 1872, to former slaves Jerry and Susan Davis. He graduated from Louisville Colored High School in June 1888 at the age of 16, second in his class of eighteen students. Davis delivered the graduation address he titled, "The Dignity of Labor".

Davis taught himself shorthand and typing, and became a legal clerk at the law firm of Cary & Spindle. Later he served as secretary to Mayor George Davidson Todd of Louisville. He also owned a thriving shoe store, which sold manufactured goods as well as making custom shoes and boots. He also taught typing and shorthand to black students, who were excluded from white segregated classes.

Before the turn of the century, David moved to Washington, DC, for its opportunities. He studied at Howard University, earning a Doctorate of Pharmacology in 1902.

== Career ==
During his period of study, Davis also founded the Mott Night Business High School. The school district heard about the success of Davis' school and asked him to become principal of Armstrong High School. He established connections among educated African Americans in the capital.

In October 1917, Emmett J. Scott, a noted assistant to Booker T. Washington, then president of Tuskegee University, was appointed by the President Woodrow Wilson administration as a special assistant to the Secretary of War Newton D. Baker, for Negro affairs during the Great War. Scott's appointment was then the highest government commission ever given an African American. Scott appointed William H. Davis as his own special assistant and manager of his five-person staff in the War Department.

At the War Department, Davis handled the complaints of black soldiers, making sure they and their families received the government benefits to which they were entitled. He ensured that the newly instituted Selective Service regulations were applied equally to all people. Davis later served as Secretary to the Presidential Commission investigating the economic conditions in the Virgin Islands.

== Marriage and family ==
He married Julia B. Hubbard and they had children, including John P. Davis, who became an attorney and civil rights activist.

== Death ==
Davis died on January 7, 1951. He was buried at Lincoln Memorial Cemetery.
