= Augherskea =

Townland in County Meath, Ireland

Coordinates: 53°30′0″N 6°36′0″W

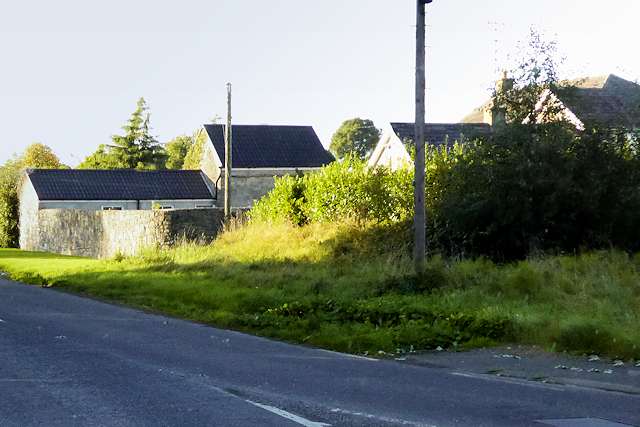
Farmhouse near Bedfanstown (geograph 5616560)

Augherskea (from Irish Eachaire Sceach, meaning 'Field of the Brambles') is a townland in the civil parish of Knockmark, barony of Lower Deece, County Meath, Ireland. It is 4 km south-west of Dunshaughlin, and 28 km north-west of Dublin city centre.

== Geography ==
Augherskea is bounded on the north by the townlands of Baronstown and Mooretown, on the east by Bedfanstown, Cultromer, Kilcooly, Knockmark and Merrywell, on the south by Culmullin and on the west by Tullaghmedan & Warrenstown. The early Ordnance Survey maps show the hamlets of Old Cross Keys and Cross Keys (Irish= Croseochracha, named after a signboard on the local pub showing keys) situated in the townland. Its chief geographical features are the Derrypatrick River, spring wells, a dug well and a gravel pit. Augherskea is bisected by the regional R154 road (Ireland) and R125 road (Ireland). The townland covers 656 statute acres.

== History ==
In medieval times the townland belonged to Kingdom of Meath. It is probable that it belonged to the medieval church of Knockmark as an early medieval burial ground has been found in the townland. After the Norman Invasion of Ireland, Meath was granted to Hugh de Lacy, Lord of Meath. In 1186 he was killed and the lands passed to his son Walter de Lacy, Lord of Meath. In 1200 Walter granted his lands in the parish of Knockmark (which would have included Augherskea) to the Abbey of Saint Thomas Becket in Thomas Street, Dublin. This reinforces the theory that it was church land originally. The townland would have been owned by the abbey until 25 July 1539 when King Henry VIII of England appropriated the lands during his Dissolution of the Monasteries. The earliest surviving mention of the townland name is in 'The Rental Book of Gerald Fitzgerald, Ninth Earl of Kildare. Begun in the Year 1518', which mentions- The myll of Aghersketh. Other early references are- 1. Probate to the will of James Talbot of Agherskeethe issued on 24 April 1584; 2. 'The Irish Statute Staple Books' for 12 May 1597, where it is spelled Agherneskine. The Down Survey map of Meath depicts it as Aghersken with several crosses beside the name, again indicating it was church land. The 1836 Ordnance Survey map also depicts part of the townland as Glebe land, again indicating it belonged to the church.

The Tithe Applotment Books for 1829 (which spells it as 'Agherstown') list 16 tithepayers in the townland.

Griffith's Valuation of 1857 lists 41 landholders in the townland.

In the 1901 census of Ireland, there are twenty families listed in the townland.

In the 1911 census of Ireland, there were 61 people listed in the townland.

== Antiquities ==
- A medieval burial ground.
- Old photos of Augherskea
