= Christopher St Lawrence, 2nd Baron Howth =

Irish politician and nobleman

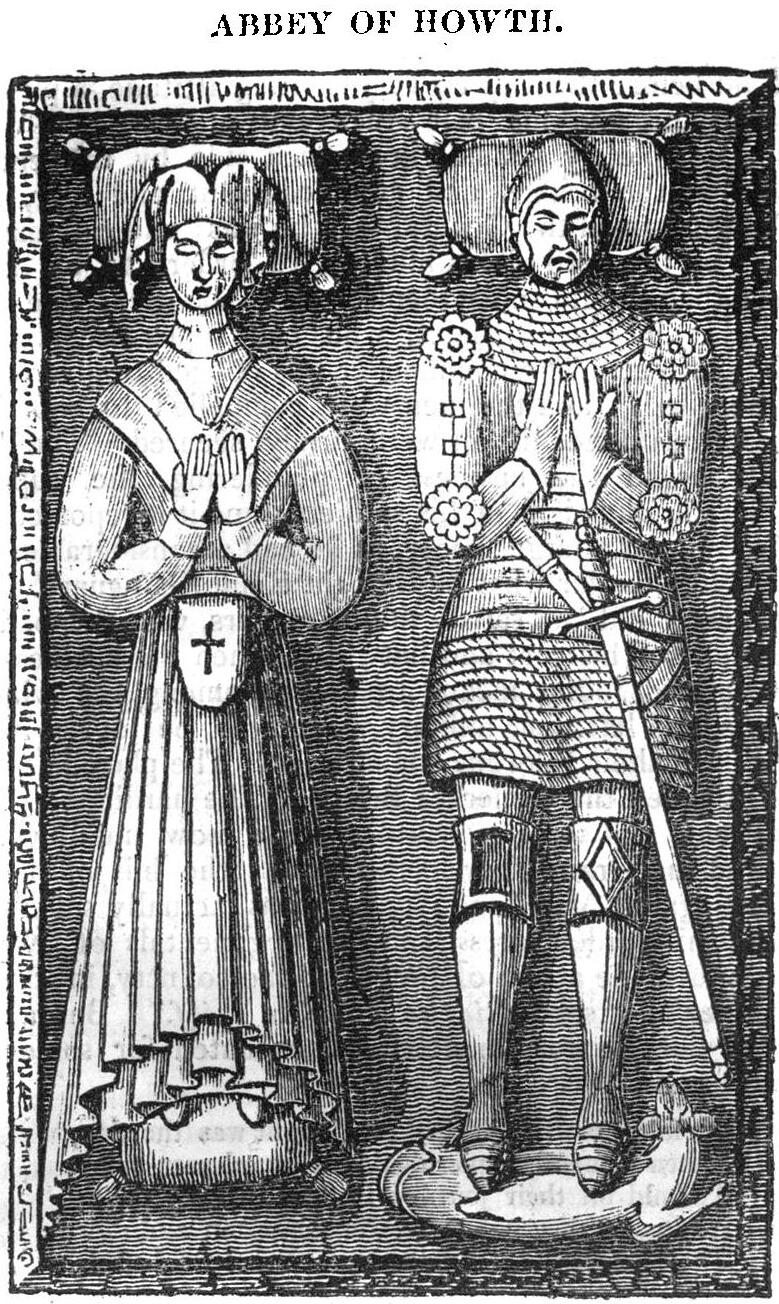
The tomb of the St. Laurence family, in the Abbey of Howth, 1833, Dublin Penny Journal

Christopher St Lawrence, 2nd Baron Howth (died 1462 or 1465) was an Irish nobleman. He was a key figure in fifteenth-century Irish politics, and one of the strongest supporters in Ireland of the House of York, who seized the English Crown in 1461. His tomb can still be seen in the family chapel in St. Mary's Church, Howth.

== Background ==
He was the son of Christopher (or Stephen) St Lawrence, 1st Baron Howth, and his wife Elizabeth Holywood, daughter of Sir Christopher Holywood (died 1416) of Artane Castle and Katherine Preston, and granddaughter of Sir Robert de Holywood, Chief Baron of the Exchequer.

As is often the case with Anglo-Irish titles, the precise date when the title Baron Howth was created is difficult to determine. A "lordship" or Irish feudal barony did not necessarily imply the creation of a hereditary peerage, nor did it automatically confer on the holder the right to sit in the Irish House of Lords. It is often said that the Crown recognised the elder Christopher as a hereditary baron around 1425, but Elrington Ball suggests that it was the younger Christopher who was recognised as the first hereditary Baron Howth in about 1461. In the Patent Roll for 1435 he is referred to as "Christopher Howth, Lord Howth".

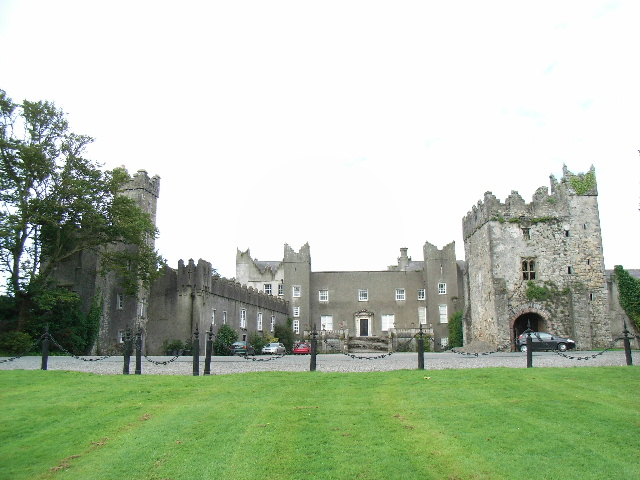
Howth Castle, the family home for centuries

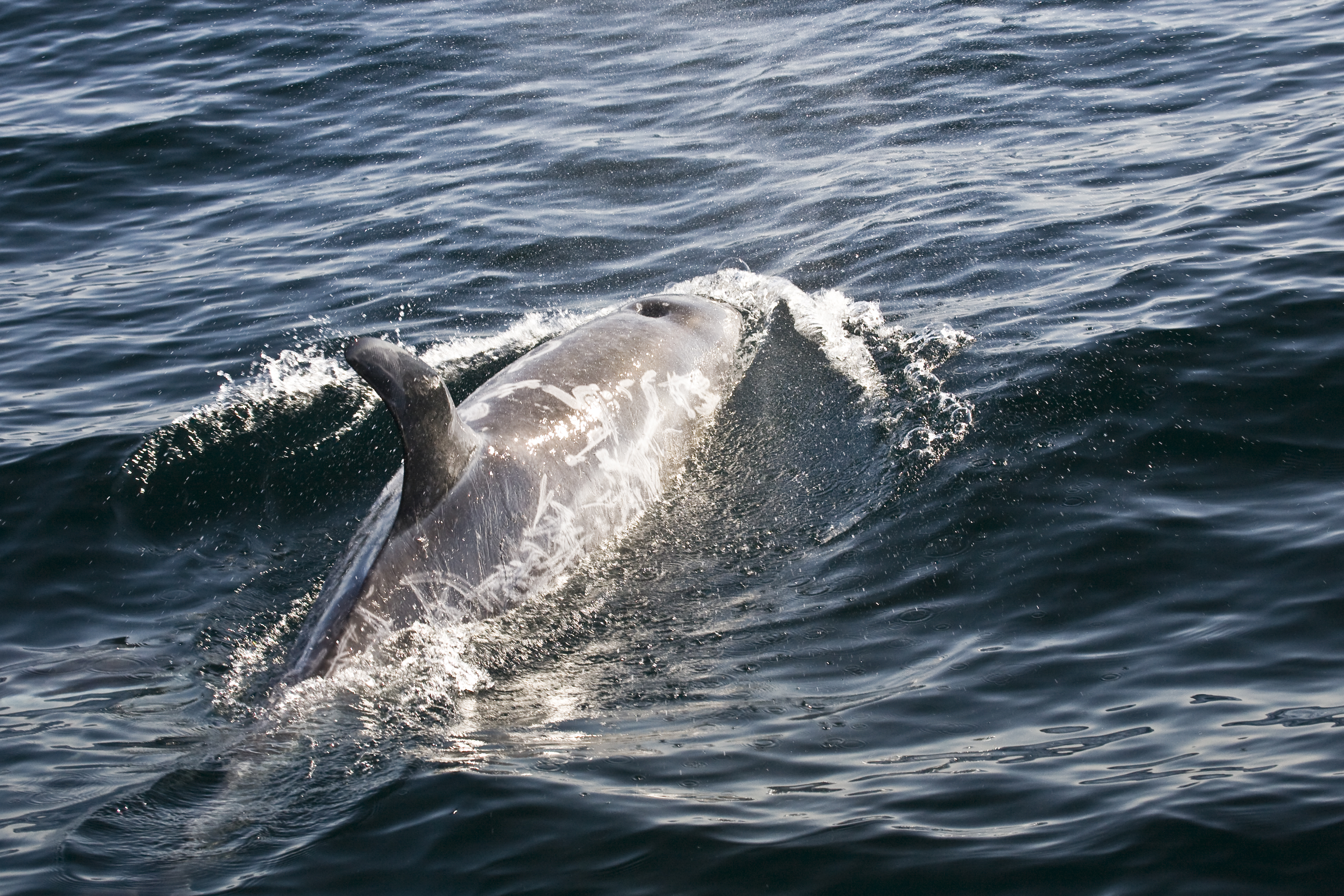
Risso's dolphin, or grampus- Lord Howth claimed, in defiance of the supposed privilege of the English Crown, the right to all dolphins and other royal fish which were stranded at Howth

== As Lord of Howth ==
He succeeded to his father's estates and title in either 1430 or 1435, and did homage to the English Crown for his lands in 1437.

He was clearly a man of strong and decided character. From the start of his career, he showed a determination to assert his control over the peninsula of Howth, and to maintain all those rights and privileges which traditionally belonged to the St Lawrence family as Lords of Howth, a title they had held since 1177. When a twelve-foot grampus (Risso's dolphin) was stranded at Howth the Crown claimed ownership of it as a royal fish, and the personal property of the monarch, by virtue of the royal prerogative, but Howth disputed the claim, arguing that since time immemorial every grampus and porpoise found on the peninsula of Howth was the property of the Lord of Howth.

He was the patron of Richard Ingram, an early mining explorer, and at a meeting of the Privy Council in 1450 was himself granted the right to search within his lordship for lead and tin, and if any was found to take the profits for three years. He quarrelled with the citizens of Wicklow Town over the ownership of a quantity of salt which he alleged they had seized unlawfully, and had them outlawed as a result; he also used his influence to have the Irish Parliament pass legislation to exempt some of his lands from taxation.

== In public life ==
Despite his determination to protect his family's hereditary rights, Howth did not neglect public affairs. He was knighted before 1442, and became a member of the Privy Council of Ireland in 1455, with an extra payment of £10 "out of the new customs" and from that date on played a crucial part in the defence of Dublin. In the same year he was given the power to exact tolls on all those using Howth harbour to defray the costs of protecting shipping from the "French, Bretons, Scots and other nations" (his eldest son many years later is found claiming the exclusive right to levy tolls at Howth against a rival claim by Dublin Corporation, although he accepted the unfavourable verdict of an arbitrator). He was also charged, jointly with his eldest son, with repairing the bridges at Lucan and Kilmainham. The same year he sat on a commission to inquire into the alleged failure of the Sheriff of County Dublin to adequately defend the county (his own eldest son Robert was Sheriff the following year), and in 1458 he sat on another commission to inquire into the conduct of the Walsh family of Carrickmines Castle, whose loyalty to the Crown was suspect. On several occasions he was entrusted by the Council with bringing messages to the King. A statute of the Parliament of Ireland passed in 1455 provided that he not be penalised for being hindered in this task.

== Yorkist cause ==
When Richard, Duke of York arrived in Ireland as Lord Lieutenant in 1449 (he was not at that stage claiming the English Crown), Lord Howth was one of his strongest allies. He returned with the Duke to England, and remained loyal to him after the setback to his fortunes which followed the Battle of Ludford Bridge in 1459. On Richard's return to Ireland later the same year, Howth was one of his key supporters in the Parliament he called. Howth was appointed to several public offices, including Constable of Dublin Castle. The legislation suggests that he was expected to accompany Richard again to England, as Richard, at last, prepared to claim the English Crown from the rival House of Lancaster, but there is no evidence that he was present at the disastrous Battle of Wakefield in December 1460, where Richard was killed.

The setback to the Yorkist cause was only temporary, and was followed by their triumph in the spring of 1461. Richard's son, the victorious King Edward IV, confirmed Howth in his office as Constable of Dublin, and recognised his right to sit in the Irish House of Lords. He and his family flourished under the House of York, although later generations were to shift their allegiance to the House of Tudor, of whom they were relatives by marriage.

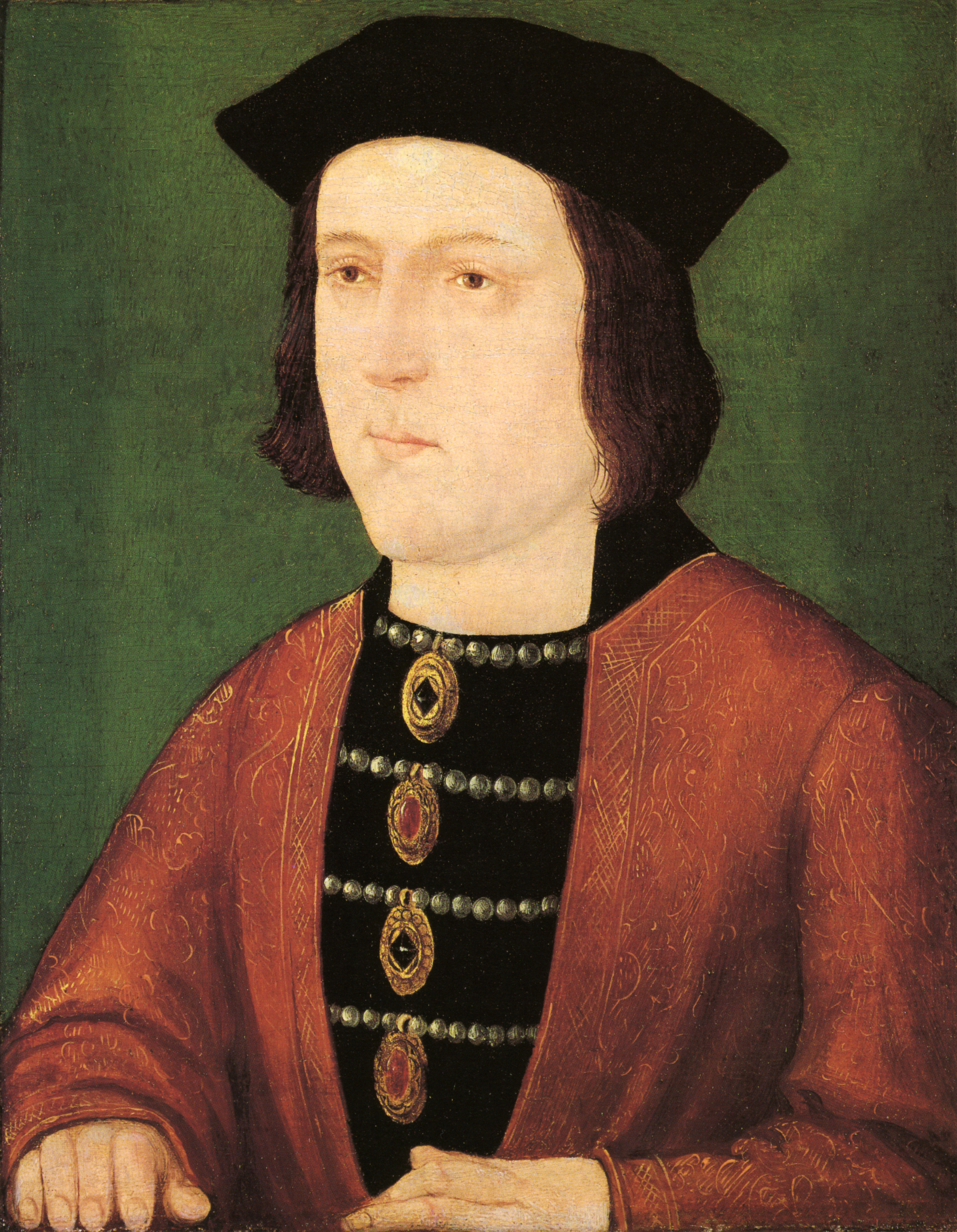
King Edward IV- Lord Howth was one of his strongest supporters in Ireland

There is some confusion over the year of his death; his tomb indicates that he died in 1462 but some sources give his date of death as 1464 or 1465. A statue of 1463, granting livery of seisin of the lands to his son and heir Robert, is good evidence for the earlier date.

== Family ==
He married, before 1435, Anne Plunkett of Ratoath, County Meath, a relative of Christopher Plunkett, 1st Baron Killeen. She survived him and remarried Anthony Percy, but is buried with her first husband at Howth Castle: the effigy of the couple survives. They had at least nine children:

- Robert St Lawrence, 3rd Baron Howth
- William, Admiral of Ireland (living 1485)
- Thomas
- Almeric, Clerk of the Rolls
- Lionel, precentor of St. Patrick's Cathedral, Dublin
- Walter St. Lawrence, Chief Baron of the Irish Exchequer (died 1504)
- Margaret, who married firstly Walter Marward, titular Baron Skryne (died 1487) and secondly Sir William Darcy of Platten
- two other daughters, whose first names are unknown.

== Character ==
Ball describes him as a man of "great qualities", who was intelligent, capable, courageous and determined.

Peerage of Ireland
Preceded by Christopher St Lawrence	Baron Howth c.1435–1462	Succeeded by Robert St Lawrence
