= River Skane =

River in County Meath, Ireland

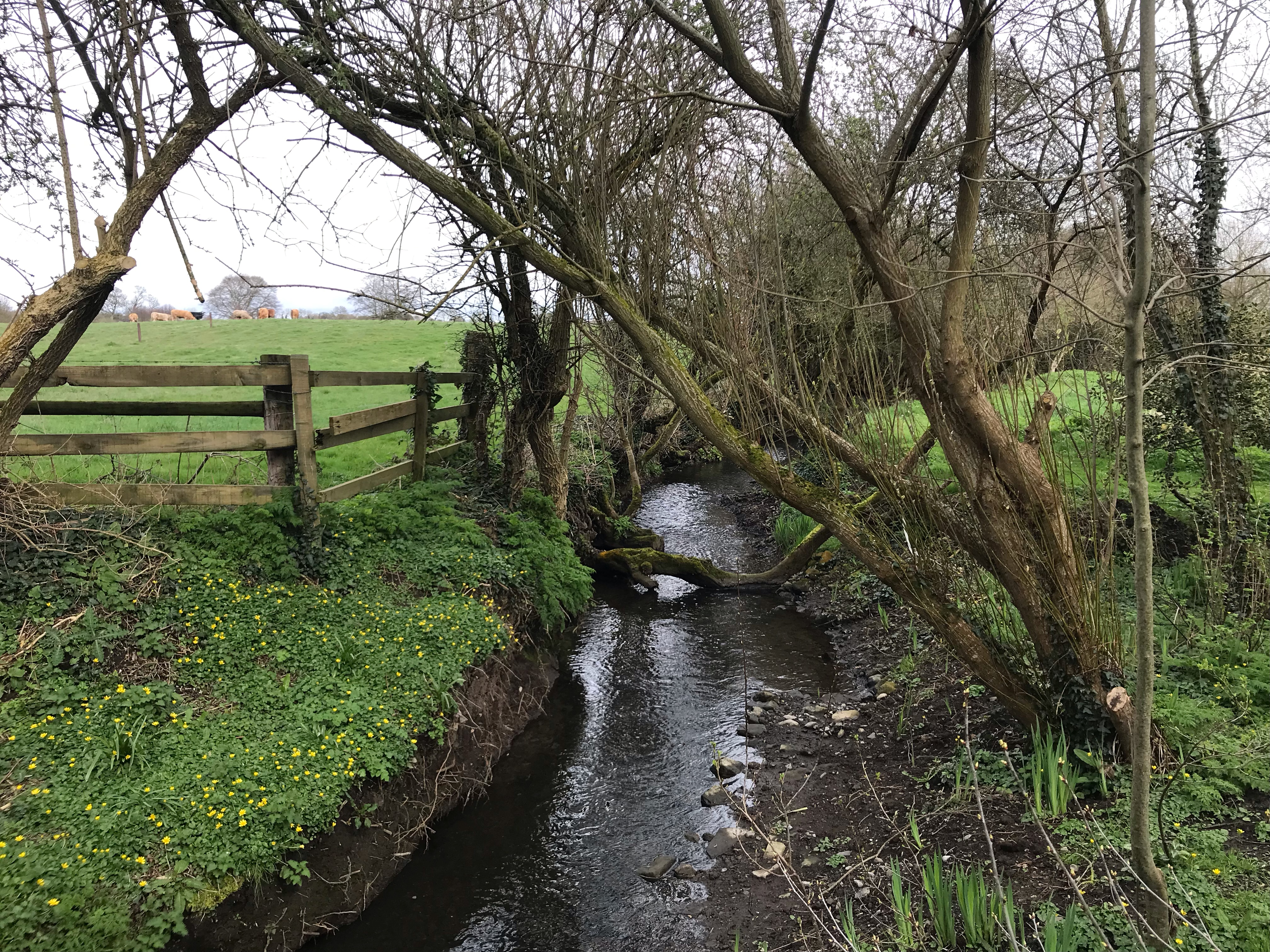
- The River Skane near Drumree, Knockmark, flowing west; looking east

Location
- Country: Ireland
- County: County Meath

Physical characteristics
- Mouth: River Boyne
  - coordinates: 53°36′31″N 6°38′39″W

The River Skane (Irish: Abhainn Scéine) is a small river or stream in County Meath, Ireland, that is a tributary of the River Boyne.

== Course ==
The River Skane rises in west Dunshaughlin, and flows westerly. After flowing underneath the R125 regional road and the M3 motorway, the River Skane marks the boundary between the civil parish of Knockmark (west) and the civil parish of Dunshaughlin (east). The River Skane then reaches the townland of Drumree in Knockmark where it assumes a northerly course. It flows adjacent to the townlands of Leshemstown in Dunshaughlin then Clowanstown in the civil parish of Killeen to its east, and the townlands of Mooretown and then Warrenstown in Knockmark to its west. It then flows westerly, through the woods of Dunsany Wood and Railway Woods, before resuming its northerly course into Kilmessan. It continues this course—receiving the waters of the River Gabhra and River Lismullin—and flows into the River Boyne in Navan.

== Characteristics ==
The River Skane generally has a width of 4–5 metres and a depth of 0.2–1 metre. According to a 2012 study of the River Skane's water quality funded by the National Roads Authority, the river was "moderately polluted."
