= Knockmark =

Civil parish in County Meath, Ireland

Coordinates: 53.506698°N 6.590785°W

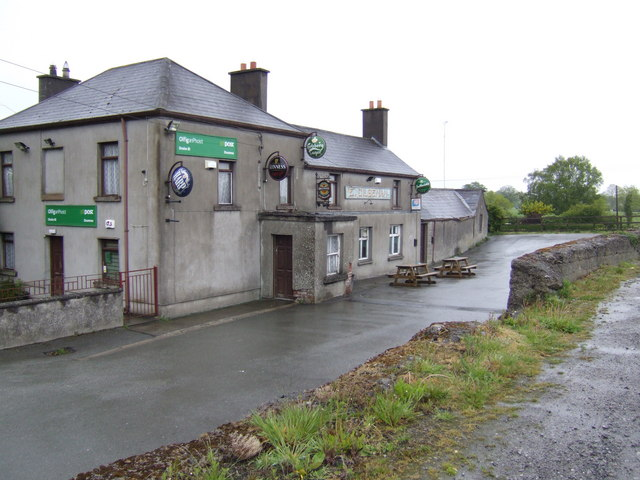
Post office and pub at Drumree, Knockmark

Knockmark (Irish: Cnoc Marc) is a civil parish located in south County Meath, Ireland, just west of the commuter town of Dunshaughlin. It comprises eleven townlands—Augherskea, Baronstown, Bedfanstown, Drumree, Glane Great, Glane Little, Kilcooly, Knockmark, Merrywell, Mooretown, and Warrenstown. Several of the townlands lie within the Dunsany estate, and parts also lie within the grounds of the former Warrenstown Agricultural College. Most of its northern boundary is defined by the River Skane, a tributary of the River Boyne.

== Transport ==
The R125 and R154 regional roads serve the south of Knockmark.
