= Walter St. Lawrence =

Anglo-Irish nobleman, lawyer and judge

Walter St. Lawrence (c.1445–1504) was an Irish nobleman, lawyer and judge. He held the offices of Attorney General for Ireland and Chief Baron of the Irish Exchequer.

He was one of the younger sons of Christopher St Lawrence, 2nd Baron Howth and Anne Plunket. His eldest brother Robert St Lawrence, 3rd Baron Howth was born before 1435; if, as Elrington Ball suggests, Walter was the youngest of his parents' six sons, this would suggest a birthdate around 1445.

His father had been a committed supporter of the House of York and had been rewarded for his loyal services to the dynasty by Edward IV, but Walter's eldest brother Robert married as his second wife Joan Beaufort, a cousin on his mother's side of the future Henry VII, and after the accession of the Tudors the St Lawrence family were reliable supporters of the new dynasty. Walter's nephew Nicholas St Lawrence, 4th Baron Howth was one of the few among the Anglo-Irish nobility who did not support the claims of the pretender Lambert Simnel to be the rightful King of England, and after the defeat of Simnel's cause at the Battle of Stoke Field in 1487, the family's rewards evidently included Walter's appointment as Attorney General in 1491.

At the second landing of Perkin Warbeck, another pretender to the Crown, in Ireland in 1495, Walter played an active part in the defence of Dublin. Again he received his reward: Ball suggests that his appointment as Chief Baron of the Exchequer the following year was the personal choice of the King. He held that office until his death in 1504.
