= Curraha =

Village in County Meath, Ireland

Coordinates: 53°32′21″N 6°26′35″W

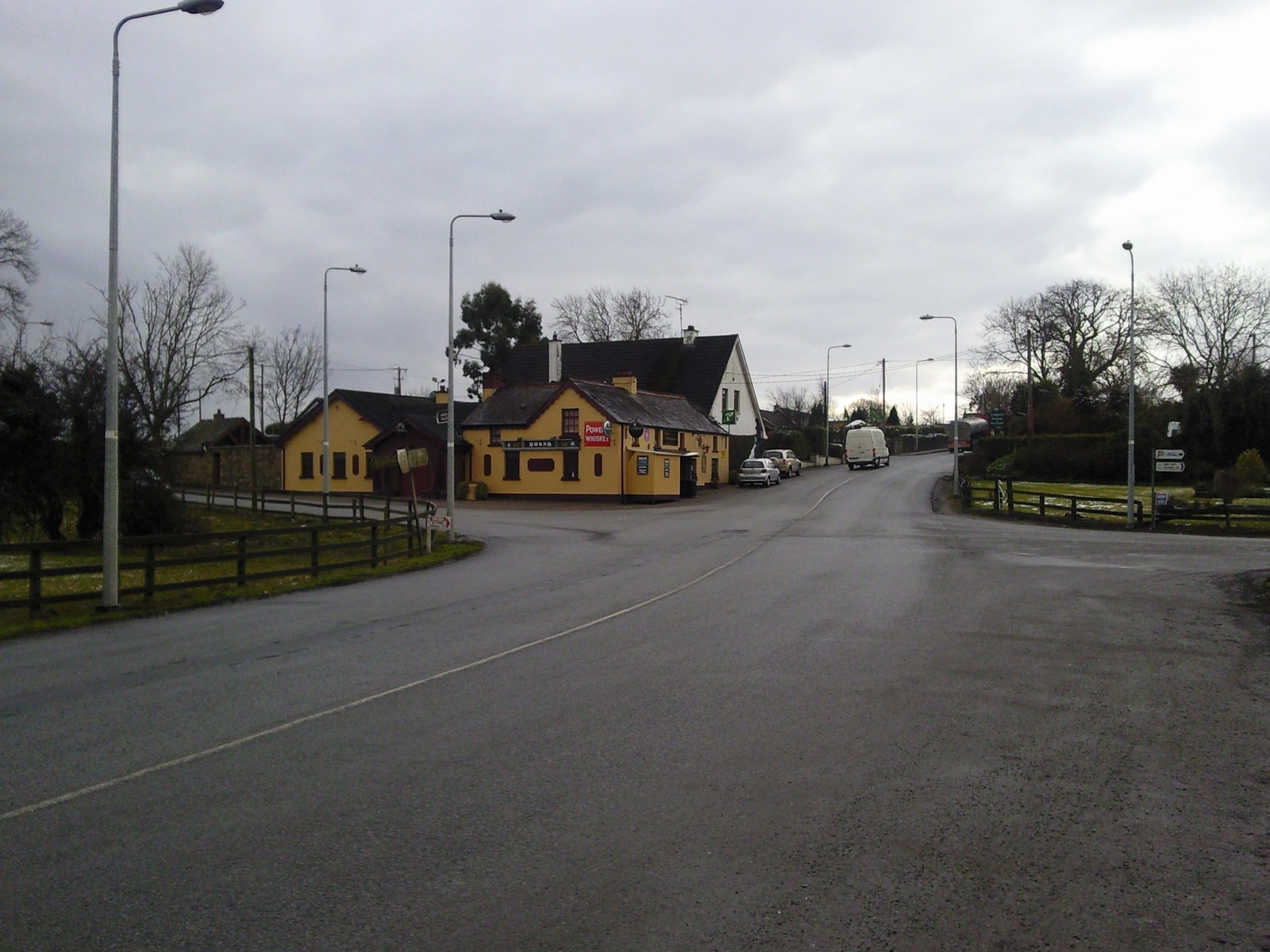
Crossroads at the Swan's public house

Curraha, also written Curragha (Irish: Currach Átha, meaning 'the ford/crossing at the marshy/boggy area'), is a small village in County Meath, Ireland. It is located 4.5 km (2.8 mi) from Ashbourne and 4 km (2.5 mi) from Ratoath, on the R155 road between Ratoath and its junction with the N2. The built-up area is mainly within Crickstown townland.

The area of Curraha stretches from the road towards Ratoath with the border not far from Ratoath Rugby pitch down to past Kilmoon Cross. It also stretches from Greenpark Bridge over to the N2 (along the 'Bog of Curraha').

The theme park Emerald Park is also located in Curraha.

== Bus service ==
Bus Éireann route 103 comes through the village four times daily (including Sundays) in each direction on its way to/from Emerald Park. In the other direction route 103 continues to Dublin via Ratoath and Ashbourne.

== Facilities ==
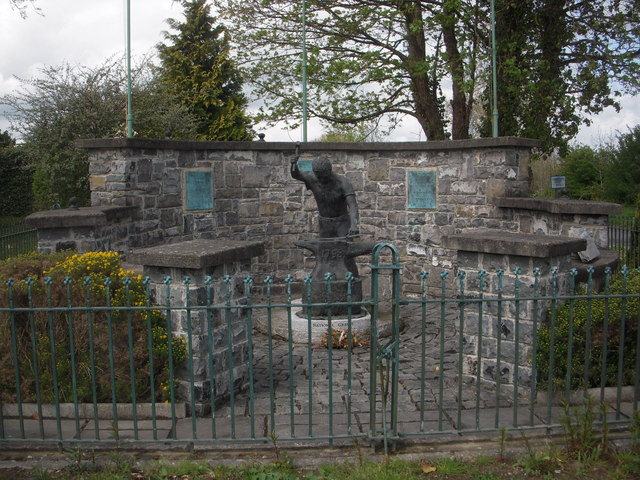
Memorial to Paud O'Donoghue

The local national (primary) school, St Andrew's National School Curraha, first opened in 1952. Curraha also has one church (St Andrew's Church, built in 1904), four cemeteries (Curraha, Crickstown, Kilbrew and Kilmoon), three local shops, two public houses (Swan's Bar & Lounge, The Snail Box Bar & Restaurant), a GAA Club (hurling & football) located at Joe McDermott Park, a tennis club (located at Curraha Church car-park) and other clubs and organisations such as Curraha ICA. The Largo Foods/Perri/Tayto factory is located in Curraha on the Kilbrew Road. Emerald Park is also located in Curraha. A statue commemorating Paud O'Donoghue, a blacksmith who participated in the 1798 rebellion, stands at the crossroads in Curraha. A ballad was composed about his participation.

== Religion ==
The local Roman Catholic church is dedicated to St Andrew and is in Curraha parish. The combined ecclesiastical parishes, of Ardcath/Clonalvy and Curraha, are administratively separate with a single parish priest. Curraha Parish Pastoral Council overlooks the running of Curraha parish. There is a parish centre and meeting room on the grounds of St Andrew's church.
