= Deece Upper =

Barony in County Meath, Ireland

Deece Upper Déise Uachtarach (Irish)
- Barony
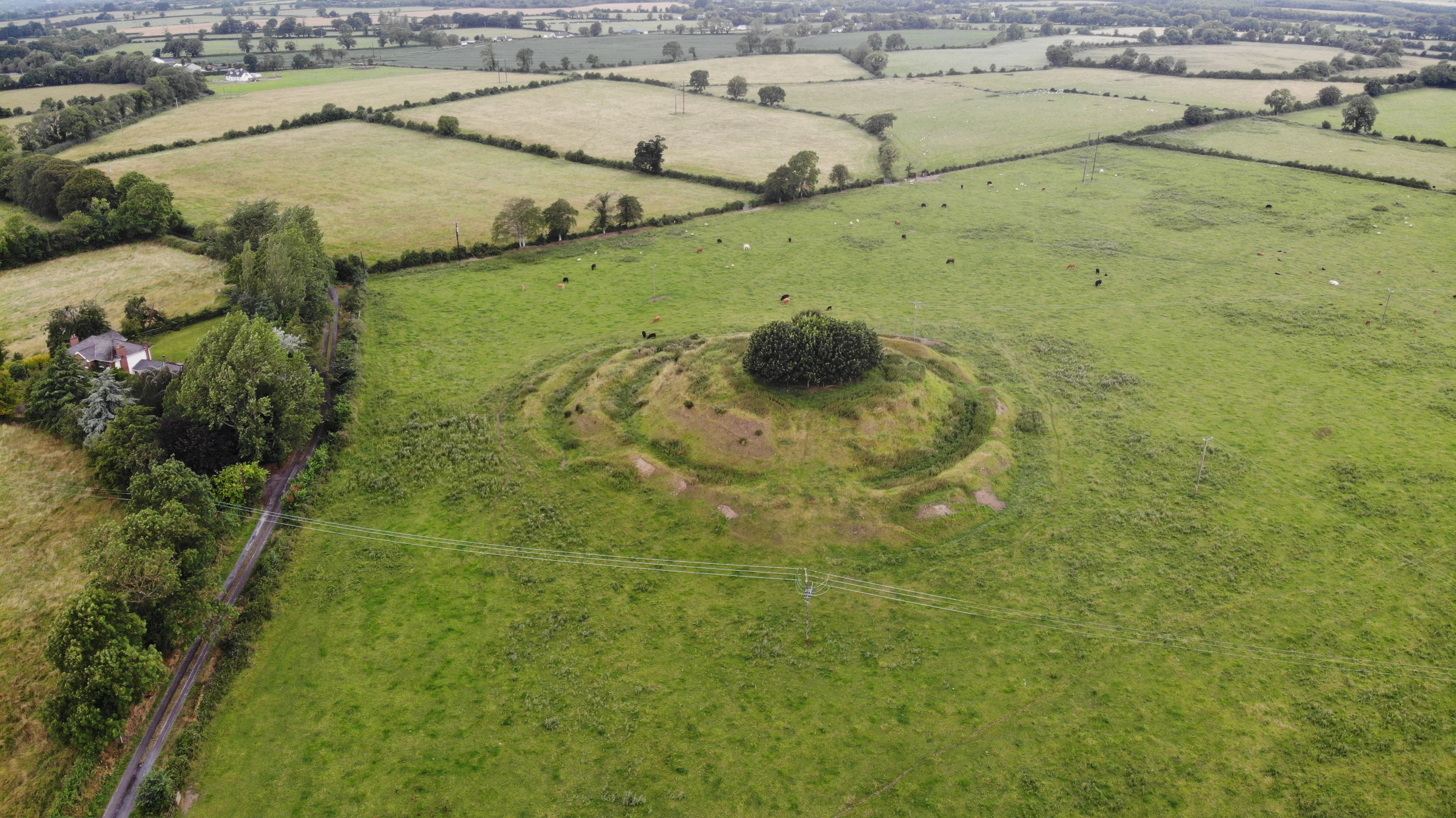
- Rodanstown Motte

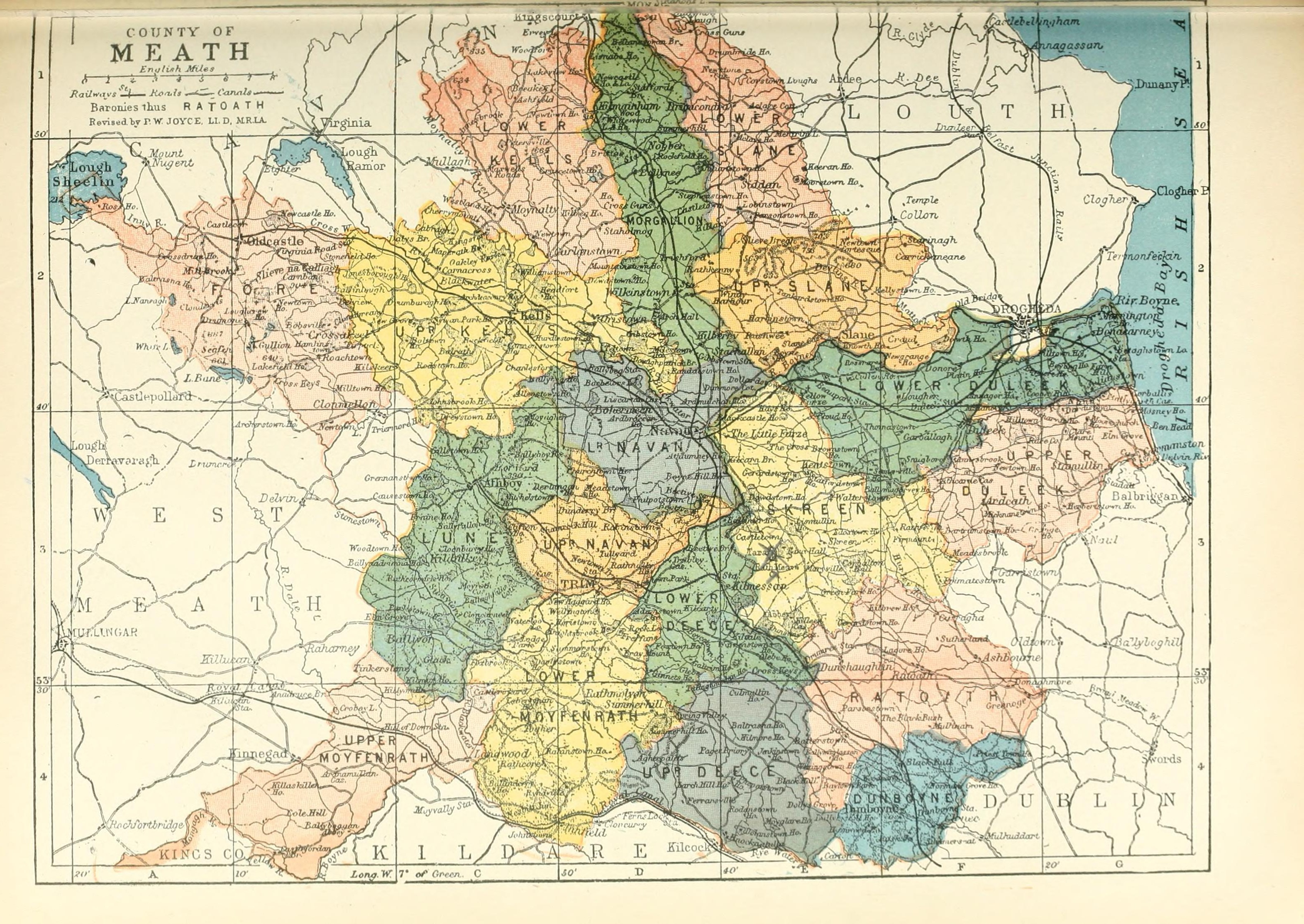
- Barony map of County Meath, 1900; Deece Upper is in the south, coloured grey.

- Location within Ireland
- Coordinates: 53°27′N 6°39′W
- Sovereign state: Ireland
- Province: Leinster
- County: Meath

Area
  - Total: 116.4 km^{2} (44.9 sq mi)

Deece Upper or Upper Deece (Irish: Déise Uachtarach) is a historical barony in southern County Meath, Ireland.

Baronies were mainly cadastral rather than administrative units. They acquired modest local taxation and spending functions in the 19th century before being superseded by the Local Government (Ireland) Act 1898.

== History ==
The barony of Deece existed before 1542 in the Lordship of Meath; it took its name from the Déisi Becc ('little Déisi'), a medieval vassal kingdom of the Kingdom of Mide. Deece Upper was the northern extremity of the Gaelic kingdom of the Ciannachta Breg. Deece was divided into Lower (northern) and Upper (southern) halves by 1807.

== Geography ==
Deece Upper is in the south of the county, to the north of the Rye River where it forms the border with County Kildare.

== List of settlements ==
Settlements within the historical barony of Deece Upper include:

- Agher
- Kilcloon
