= Robert St Lawrence, 3rd Baron Howth =

Robert St Lawrence, 3rd Baron Howth (born c.1435 – died before 1488) was a leading nobleman and statesman in 15th-century Ireland who held the office of Lord Chancellor of Ireland. Through his second marriage, he was a close connection to the new Tudor dynasty, to which his son was staunchly loyal.

== Background ==
Robert was born about 1435, the eldest son of Christopher St Lawrence, 2nd Baron Howth. There is some dispute about the identity of his mother. The Dictionary of National Biography entry for Robert mentions that she was Elizabeth Bermingham of Athenry and his father's first wife. But some modern researchers consider her to be Anne Plunkett (probably of Ratoath, County Meath), a cousin of Christopher Plunkett, 1st Baron Killeen, as first (rather than second) wife of his father. After his father's death, Anne remarried Anthony Percy. Upon her death, she was buried at Howth beside her first husband.

The reason for revising the identity of his mother has been a reference (considered reliable) to Robert's descendants being distant cousins of Christopher Plunkett, 1st Baron Killeen. But the revisionists may have overlooked the fact that Robert's paternal grandfather's mother was Alice Plunkett, Lady Howth, born circa 1350, daughter of John Plunkett of Beaulieu.

Robert succeeded to the title between 1462 and 1465. He was granted possession of the family estates by an Act of Parliament in 1463, suggesting that his father had died either in that year or the previous year.

== Career ==
O'Flanagan calls him "a nobleman of considerable abilities, who filled several offices connected with the Government of Ireland". He was also, like his father, determined to assert his family's traditional rights as Lords of Howth, and was sometimes accused of overstepping the law as a result. In 1468 he was charged with piracy, the particulars of the offence being that he has attacked a Breton merchant ship off nearby Lambay Island, pursuing it as far as Drogheda, and seizing the anchor. However, he was acquitted of the charge of piracy. Much later, in 1482, he had a dispute with Dublin Corporation over its right to levy customs on the port of Howth, insisting that by long tradition this was his sole prerogative as Lord of Howth (his father had claimed the same right). He agreed to send the matter to arbitration, and accepted the arbitrator's verdict that the Corporation was in the right. He was receiver of customs for the ports of Rush, Rogerstown and Portrane. In 1460, he was charged with overseeing the drainage work at Balrothery bog, Fingal.

He was an associate of the powerful and charismatic Thomas FitzGerald, 7th Earl of Desmond, whose supposed ambitions to rule Ireland aroused the suspicion and hostility of the English Crown. The notoriously vindictive session of the Parliament of Ireland held at Drogheda in 1468 was largely devoted to destroying Desmond and his associates. Howth, however, was able to obtain an exemption from any acts of forfeiture passed by Parliament, and an indictment against him was quashed in the same session of Parliament.

He was High Sheriff of County Dublin in 1456, Chancellor of the Green Wax in 1468, Chancellor of the Exchequer of Ireland in 1478 (the last two offices were often interchangeable), and Clerk of the Court of Common Pleas (Ireland). Like his father, he played a key role in the defence of Dublin. He was ordered to erect a tower at Kilmainham bridge, and in 1467, was charged with organising the militia. In 1474, he was chosen to be one of the thirteen Knights of the Brotherhood of Saint George, a standing army charged with defending the Pale against invasion by neighbouring Gaelic clans, and with keeping the peace generally.

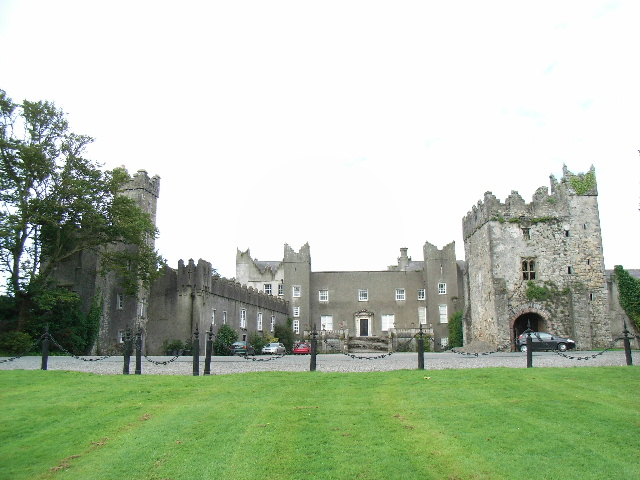
Howth Castle

In 1483, Richard III chose him to be Lord Chancellor of Ireland, despite opposition from Gerald FitzGerald, 8th Earl of Kildare, who was then almost all-powerful in Ireland. The Great Seal of Ireland had briefly been in the keeping of Walter Champfleur, the Abbot of St Mary's Abbey, Dublin. Lord Howth's continued employment by the Yorkist kings after his second marriage in 1478 is surprising, given that his second wife Joan Beaufort was a close relative of Henry Tudor, who was to overthrow the House of York in 1485. In any event, his tenure as Lord Chancellor was short, ending either with his removal or his death. His death probably took place later in 1483, although some sources place it as late as 1487.

== Family ==
Robert married firstly Alice White, daughter of Nicholas White of Killester, and by this marriage acquired the manor of Killester. In 1478 he made a second and politically significant marriage to Joan Beaufort, daughter of Edmund Beaufort, 2nd Duke of Somerset and Eleanor Beauchamp. Somerset's seemingly remote claim to the English Crown as the legal heir of John of Gaunt was inherited by his cousin Margaret Beaufort's son Henry VII, who became the first Tudor monarch. In the years following the marriage the St Lawrences, unlike most of the Anglo-Irish nobility, were reliable supporters of the Tudor dynasty: clearly, the family connection was too valuable to them not to be taken full advantage of.

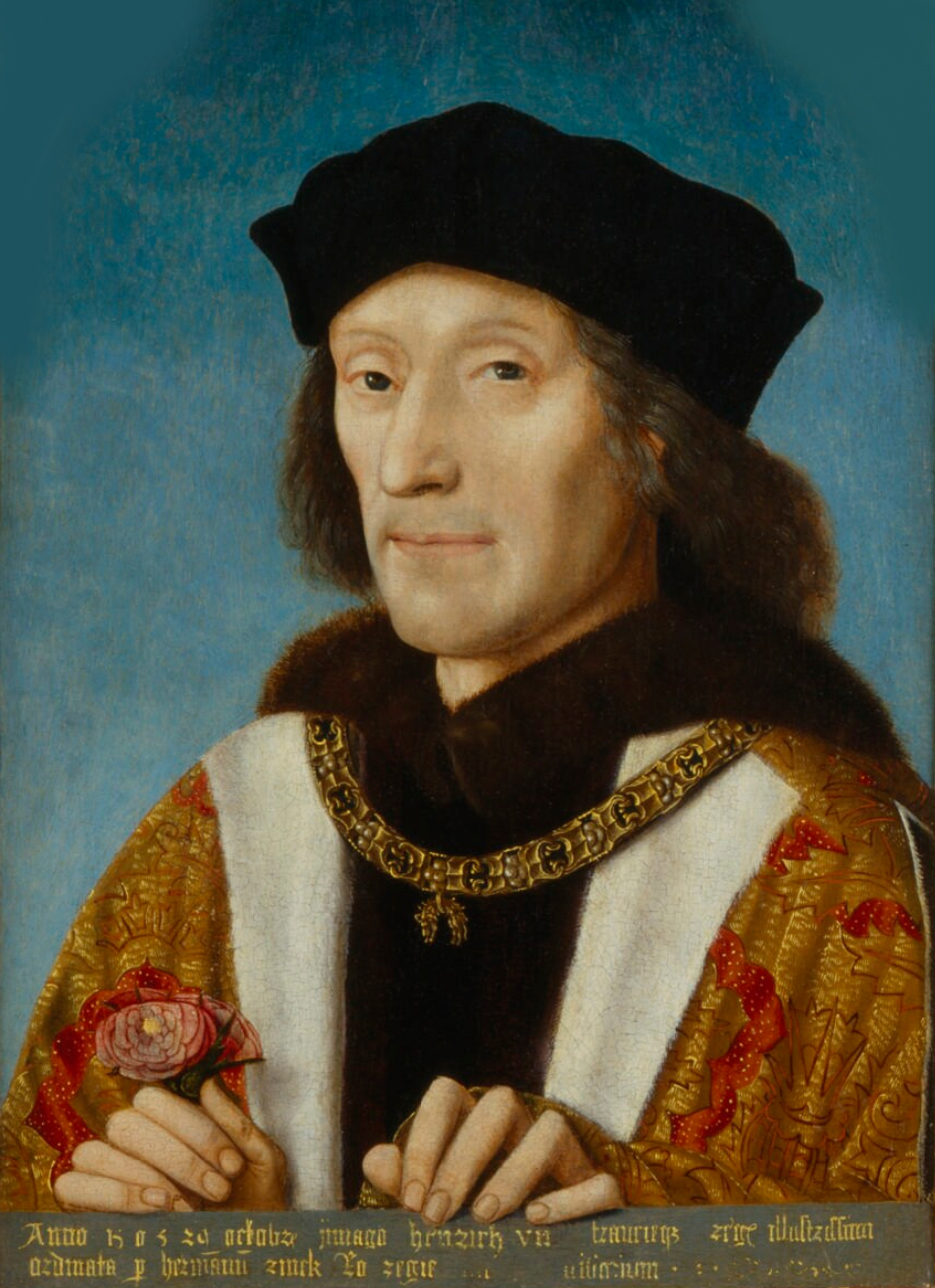
King Henry VII of England- Lord Howth was his cousin by marriage, and a reliable supporter of his Tudor dynasty

He had six children:

- Nicholas St Lawrence, 4th Baron Howth
- Thomas St. Lawrence, who became Attorney General for Ireland and a judge of the Court of King's Bench (Ireland)
- Walter
- Christopher
- Genet, who married Thomas Fitzsimons
- Anne, who married William Golding.

Some sources state that his second marriage was childless, but his eldest son Nicholas, who was born about 1460, must have been about twenty years older than his second son Thomas, who was studying law at the Inns of Court in London in 1503 and survived until 1553, so it is likely that Thomas, Walter and Christopher were children of their father's second marriage to Joan Beaufort. Joan remarried Sir Richard Fry, and died in 1518.

Peerage of Ireland
Preceded by Christopher St Lawrence	Baron Howth; 1462–c.1488	Succeeded by Nicholas St Lawrence
