= Baron Ratoath =

Ireland peerage title

Baron Ratoath was a short-lived title in the Peerage of Ireland. It was created in 1468 for Sir Robert Bold, who died without male heirs in 1479.

== Robert Bold ==
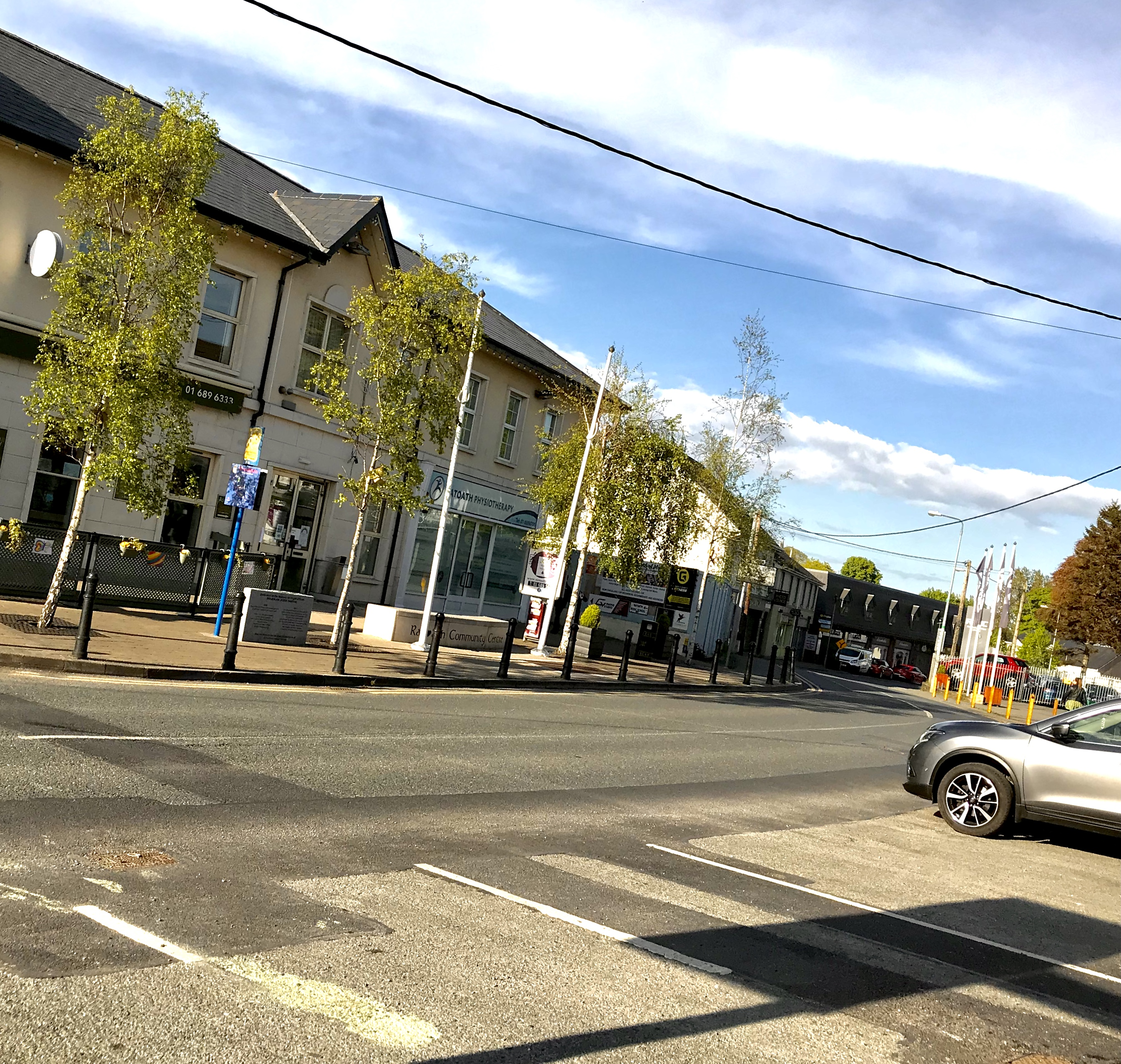
Main Street, Ratoath, present day

The barony of Ratoath was created in 1468 for the English-born soldier and landowner Sir Robert Bold of Bold, St Helens, Lancashire and Ratoath, County Meath. It was granted by King Edward IV, as a reward for Bold's loyal service to the King and his father Richard, Duke of York during the Wars of the Roses, in which he had fought for the House of York both in England and Ireland. The title was to pass to his male heirs. At the same time, he was granted the manor of Ratoath (described in the grant as "Rathonth", although contemporaries often used current spelling) and lands at Culmullen, Drumcree (now in County Westmeath).

He served as High Sheriff of Meath in 1470 and 1472. He was pardoned in 1467 with others for coin clipping. He was also given leave to go abroad for eight years, although it does not seem that he did so. In 1474 he witnessed the charter establishing the Dublin Smith's Guild, which ranked third in precedence among the Guilds of the City of Dublin.

In 1470 he was sent to England by the Privy Council of Ireland to report to the King on the state of the Irish government, and returned with a list of instructions for improving its efficiency. In 1472, rather surprisingly, he was accused by his enemies of forgery, in that the purported answers he had brought from the King to the Council had been falsified, but, having produced testimony that the answers were genuine, he was declared innocent by Act of Parliament.

=== Background ===
Bold was born in Bold, St Helens, in present-day Merseyside, a younger son of the ancient family of Bold (or Bolde) of Bold Hall, who were Lords of the Manor of Bold from the twelfth to the eighteenth centuries.

=== Inheritance ===
Lord Ratoath married twice, although little is known of his first marriage. His second wife was Ismay Serjeant, daughter of Sir Robert Serjeant, and co-heiress with her sister Joan of the manor of Castleknock; she was the widow of Sir Nicholas Barnewall, Lord Chief Justice of Ireland. Ratoath had one surviving daughter, Catherine, by his first wife, and at his death in 1479 without male issue, the title became extinct, as it was expressed to be limited to male heirs. His estates passed by descent to the Barnewall family, Catherine having married Edmund Barnewall, the younger son of her stepmother Ismay by Ismay's first husband Sir Nicholas Barnewall.

== Barons Ratoath (created 1468) ==
- Robert Bold, 1st Baron Ratoath (died 1479)
