= R155 road (Ireland) =

Road in Ireland

R155 road
- Bóthar R155

Route information
- Length: 14 km (8.7 mi)

Location
- Country: Ireland
- Primary destinations: County Meath; Black Bull - leaves the R147; Passes the entrance to Fairyhouse Racecourse; Ratoath – (R125); Curragha; Crosses the Hurley River; Terminates at the N2

Highway system
- Roads in Ireland; Motorways; Primary; Secondary; Regional

The R155 road is a regional road in Ireland, linking the R147 to the N2 in County Meath via the town of Ratoath, where it crosses the R125. It passes the main entrance to Fairyhouse Racecourse near the town.

The route is 14 km long.

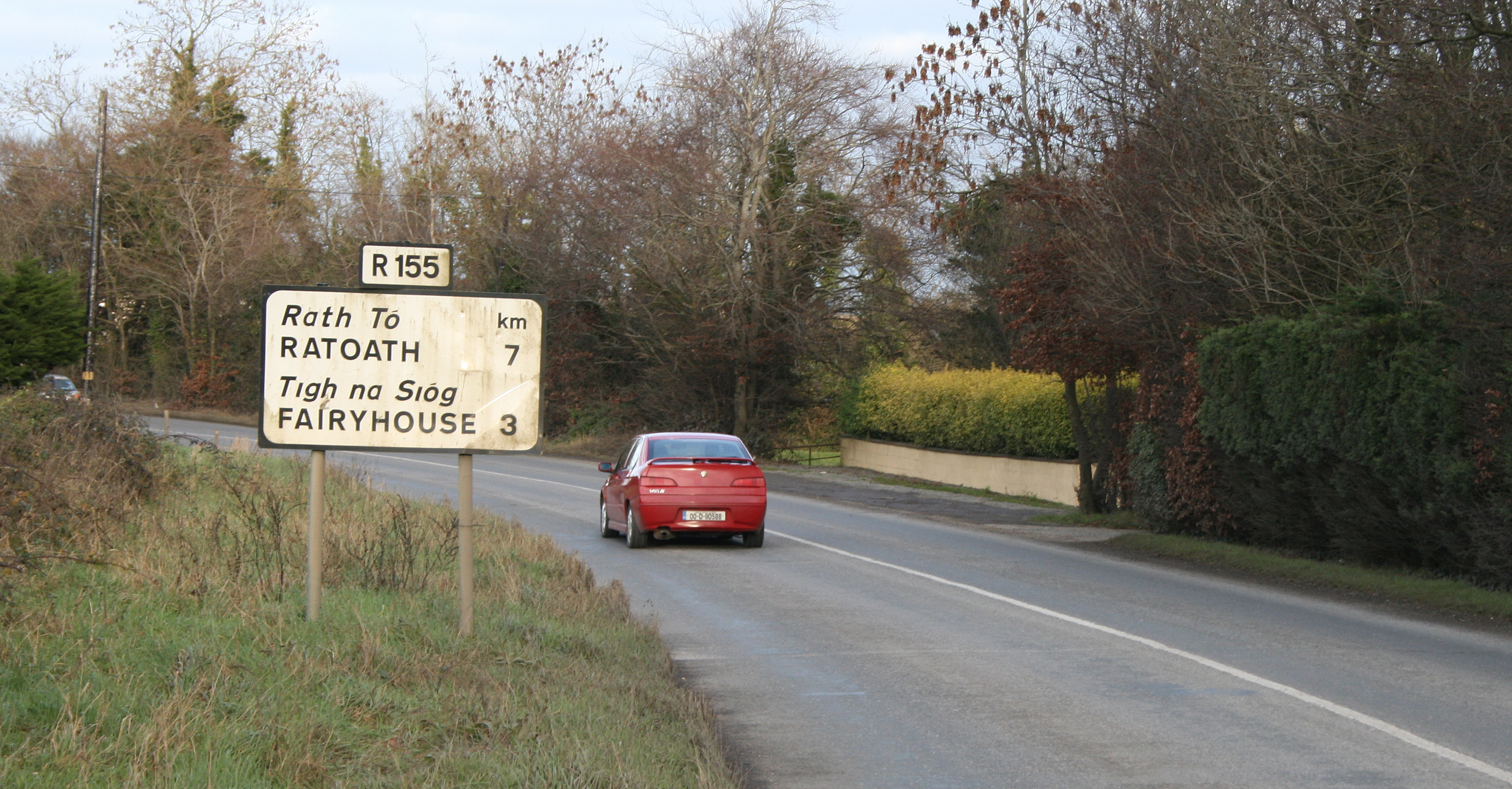
R155 at Black Bull Clickable image: click a sign to go to its destination article

== See also ==
- Roads in Ireland
- National primary road
- National secondary road
