= Royal fish =

Law in the United Kingdom

Under the law of the United Kingdom, whales (which are mammals) and sturgeons are royal fish, and when taken become the personal property of the monarch of the United Kingdom as part of his or her royal prerogative.

== In England and Wales ==
According to William Blackstone's Commentaries on the Laws of England, the "superior excellence" of whale and sturgeon made them uniquely suited for the monarch's use. Sir Matthew Hale added porpoise as one of the royal fish. Near the English coast they belong to the monarch immediately upon being caught, while ownership is also transferred to the monarch when a catch from any location is cast up on the shores. The kings of Denmark and the dukes of Normandy enjoyed a similar prerogative.

The monarch's right to royal fish was recognized by a statute enacted in 1324, during the reign of Edward II, that applied to whales and sturgeon. According to Henry de Bracton, de balena vero sufficit ... si rex habeat caput, et regina caudam: "the king owns the head of the whale, the queen owns the tail". In Moby-Dick, Herman Melville quoted the speculations of jurist William Prynne, that the queen received the tail, in order to be supplied with whalebone for her corsets and stays (although as Melville points out, "whalebone" is in fact baleen, from the mouths of certain whales).

Under current law, the Receiver of Wreck is the official appointed to take possession of royal fish when they arrive on English shores. The law of royal fish continues to excite some notice and occasional use, as evidenced when a fisherman caught and sold a sturgeon in Swansea Bay in 2004. After informing of the sturgeon to Queen Elizabeth II, the fisherman, a man named Robert Davies, received notice that he could use the 264 lb (120 kg) catch 'as he saw fit'. Davies donated the fish to the Natural History Museum in London.

== In Scotland ==
In Scotland, the monarch's property right inheres in those whales too large to be pulled to land by a "wain pulled by six oxen"; in practice, this is interpreted as requiring the whales to be over 25 feet (7.6 m) long. Authority to collect them on behalf of the monarch is given to the Scottish Government through the Marine Scotland directorate.

== In Ireland ==
In Ireland the English Crown, which held the Lordship of Ireland, also claimed the prerogative of taking royal fish, which extended to porpoises and dolphins. There is a record of a dispute between the Crown and Christopher St Lawrence, 2nd Baron Howth in about 1440 over the ownership of an exceptionally large grampus (Risso's dolphin) which had been stranded on Howth peninsula in Dublin Bay. The Crown claimed it as a royal fish, while Lord Howth claimed it on foot of the immemorial right of his family to take possession of every grampus and porpoise found on the peninsula.

== See also ==
- Swan Upping
