= Deece Lower =

Barony in County Meath, Ireland

Deece Lower Déise Íochtarach (Irish)
- Barony
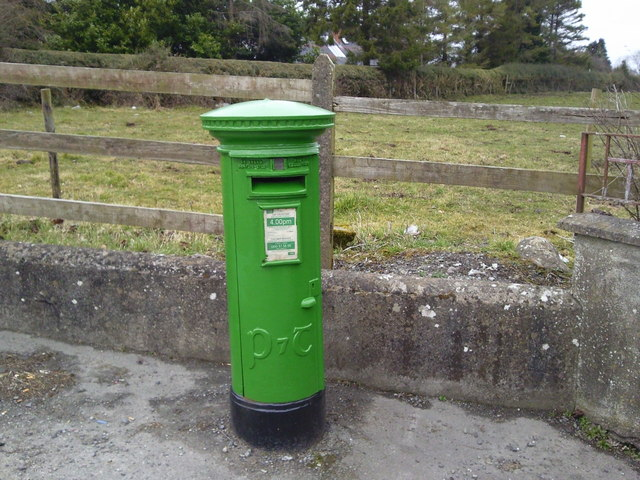
- Postbox, Drumree

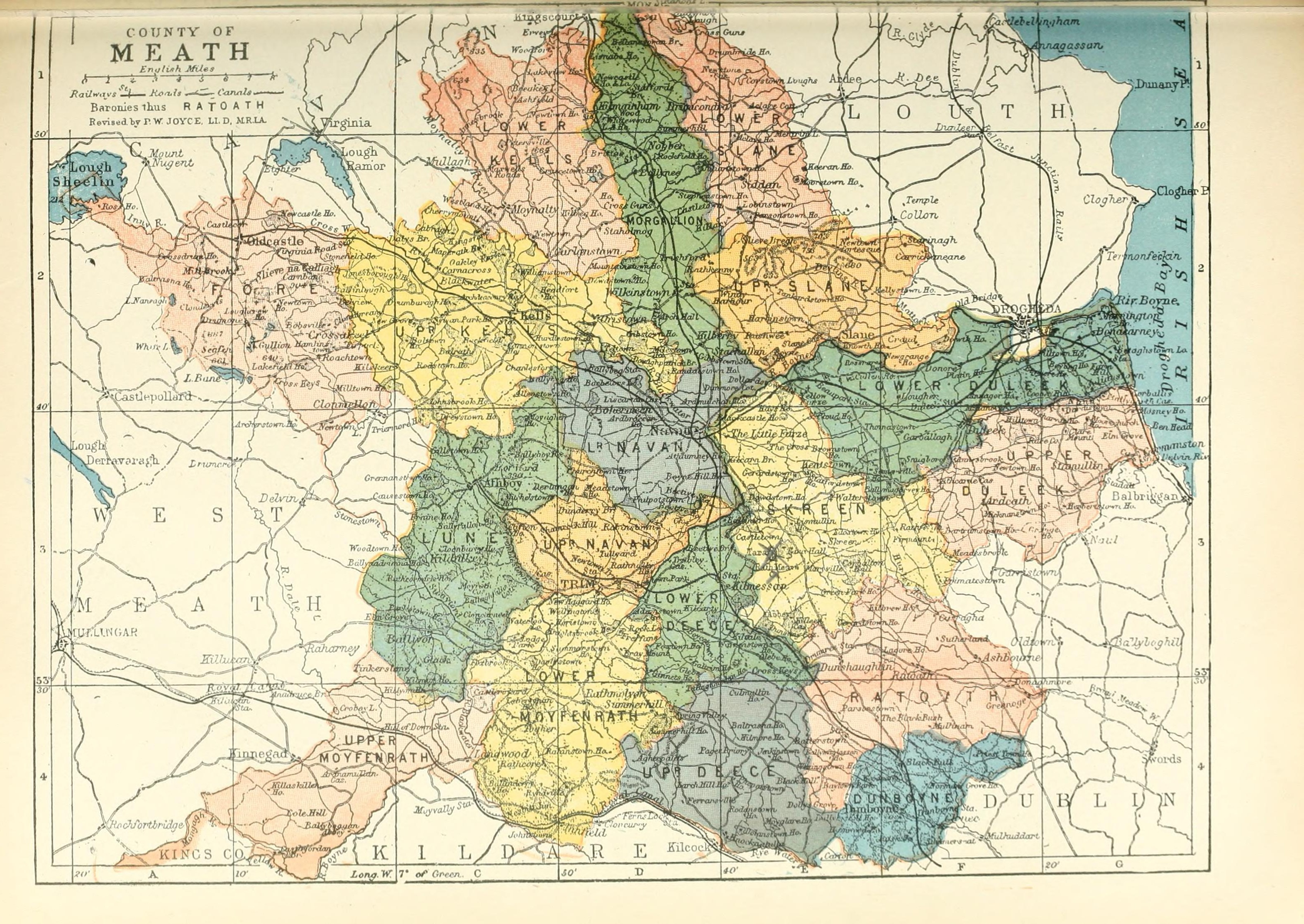
- Barony map of County Meath, 1900; Deece Lower is in the middle, coloured green.

- Location within Ireland
- Coordinates: 53°32′N 6°40′W
- Sovereign state: Ireland
- Province: Leinster
- County: Meath

Area
  - Total: 81.0 km^{2} (31.3 sq mi)

Deece Lower or Lower Deece (/ˈdiːs/; Irish: Déise Íochtarach) is a historical barony in central County Meath, Ireland.

Baronies were mainly cadastral rather than administrative units. They acquired modest local taxation and spending functions in the 19th century before being superseded by the Local Government (Ireland) Act 1898.

== History ==
The barony of Deece existed before 1542 in the Lordship of Meath; it took its name from the Déisi Becc ('little Déisi'), a medieval vassal kingdom of the Kingdom of Mide. The Déisi Becc were ruled by the Ó Dubháin (O'Duane) of Knowth and the Ua Maoil Lughdhach (O'Molluwey?) of Brú na Bóinne. Deece was divided into Lower (northern) and Upper (southern) halves by 1807.

== Geography ==
Deece Lower is in the middle of the county, to the southeast of the River Boyne; the countryside between Trim and Dunshaughlin.

== List of settlements ==
Settlements within the historical barony of Deece Lower include:

- Drumree
- Kilmessan
