= Ratoath (barony) =

Barony in County Meath, Ireland

Ratoath (Irish: Ráth Tó) is a barony in County Meath. It comprises ten parishes and portion of two others viz Rathbeggan, Dunshaughlin, Kilbrew, Crickstown, Killegland, Cookstown, Donaghmore, Ratoath, and portions of Ballymaglasson and Trevit.

== Feudal History ==
The Normans landed in Ireland in 1169 and captured the Danish city of Waterford. It is likely that the only cities or strongholds in the country at the time were those founded by the Danes, and of these the most important was Dublin, which was captured soon afterwards by Milo de Cogan and successfully held by him in spite of a long siege by Ruaidrí Ua Conchobair, the High King of Ireland, who had the co-operation of the Danes.

Henry II of England arrived in Dublin in 1172 and many of the Gaelic Chieftains made their submission to him, i.e., they recognised him as their feudal lord, who gave them the right or title to the lands they held. In other words, Henry applied to Ireland the Norman or feudal system of land tenure which prevailed on the continent and which the Normans introduced into England. This meant displacing some of the native kings – one of whom was the king of Meath or Tara.

Henry granted Hugh de Lacy "the land of Meath in as full a measure as Murchadh Ó Maoilsheachlainn or anyone before or after him held it." The technical name of this grant was a Liberty and it meant that, within his Liberty, de Lacy’s power of jurisdiction was equal to that of the king himself with one reservation, that the king could dispose of Church lands anywhere. The person enjoying such liberal delegation of royal jurisdiction was known as a Count and the territory over which he ruled was called a county. One of the privileges of a Count Palatinate, such as de Lacy in this case, was that he could create barons or inferior lords who held their land from the Count. Some time after 1196, the son of Hugh de Lacy, named Walter, granted "the whole land of Rathtowth" to his younger brother, Hugh. Hence we have now the sub-division of the county Meath named the Barony of Ratoath and it has the distinction of being perhaps the first instance that the term, barony, was used in Ireland for a division of a county.

It is likely that it was this second Hugh de Lacy who erected that large moat that stands out so prominently adjacent to the Catholic Church in the village. (The Rath that gives its name to the village). The site was well chosen. The summit commands a view of most of the barony. It had all the other characteristics of the typical Norman fort – a keep, bailium, fosse, etc. The Normans had to defend themselves in a new country that was thinly populated and almost without roads. They set up their own courts to administer justice and keep the peace. As in England, the native population in the area made no resistance. It was not so along the borders where the native kings raided the Norman territory just as they raided and were raided by their neighbours. Before long Ratoath was well inside the Norman territory and it was not necessary for them to build a stone castle for defence such as they erected at Duleek, Slane, Dunshaughlin, etc. It may have been this Hugh de Lacy too, that erected the first Church in Ratoath as the site in the old cemetery was just then right by Norman practice. On the other hand, the fact that its patron is the Most Holy Trinity suggests either as earlier foundation, as the Normans usually dedicated their churches to Our Blessed Lady or to one of the saints, or that they borrowed the title from an existing church in the neighbourhood.

As the head or chief centre of a barony, Ratoath village enjoyed a certain prestige. The village was chartered for the holding of fairs and markets at an early period and it had its "portreeve" (local magistrate) and all the usual officials. The courts were held here also and had its Manor House where manorial courts were held up until 1830. This is now the Nursing Home.

== See also ==
- Ratoath (Parliament of Ireland constituency)
- List of towns and villages in Ireland
