= Risso's dolphin =

- Size compared to an average human

Conservation status
- Least Concern (IUCN 3.1)

- Secure (NatureServe)
- CITES Appendix II

Scientific classification
- Kingdom: Animalia
- Phylum: Chordata
- Class: Mammalia
- Order: Artiodactyla
- Infraorder: Cetacea
- Family: Delphinidae
- Genus: Grampus; Gray, 1828
- Species: G. griseus

Binomial name
- Grampus griseus (G. Cuvier, 1812)
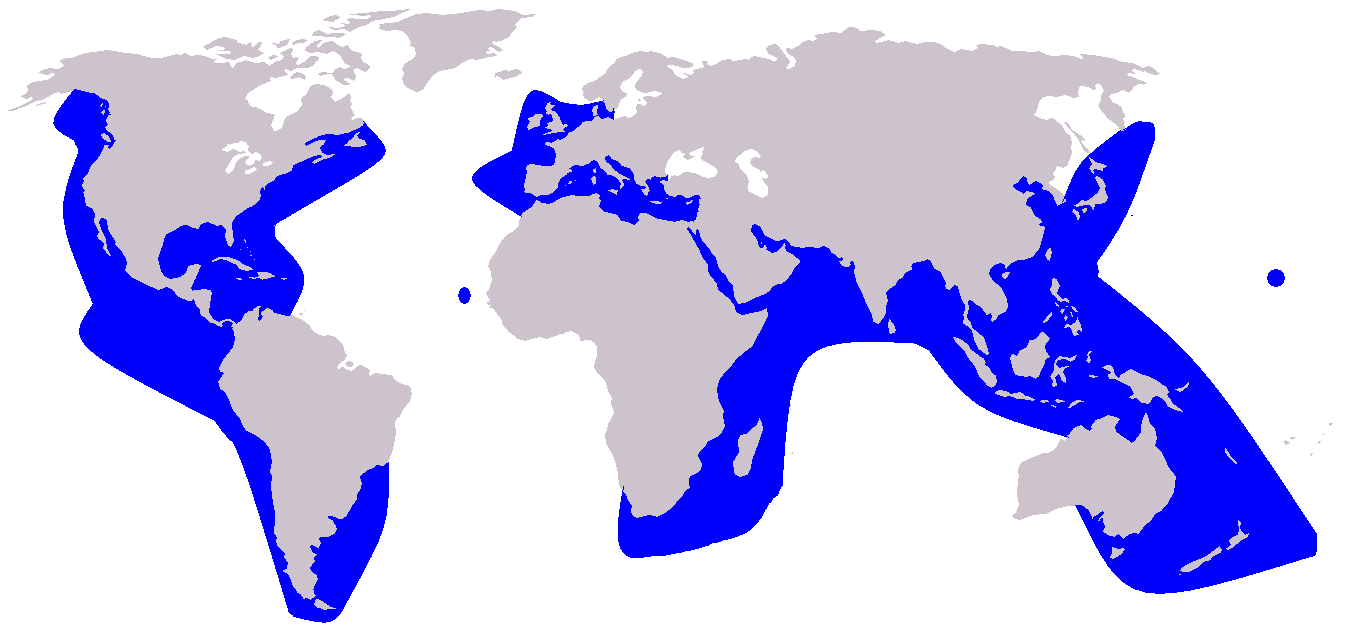
- Distribution of Risso's dolphin

Species of marine mammal

Risso's dolphin (Grampus griseus) is the only species of the genus Grampus in the family Delphinidae (dolphins). Some of the most closely related species to these dolphins include pilot whales (Globicephala spp.), pygmy killer whales (Feresa attenuata), melon-headed whales (Peponocephala electra), and false killer whales (Pseudorca crassidens). These dolphins grow to be about 10 ft in length and can be identified by heavy scarring that appears white. They are located worldwide in cold to temperate waters, but most typically are found along continental shelves due to their eating habits. Risso's dolphins have a diet that contains primarily cephalopods. They are able to search for prey at various depths due to their ability to reach depths of almost 600 m (2,000 ft). Individuals typically travel in pods ranging from 10 to 50 dolphins, with which they form tight social bonds.

Like most marine species, Risso's dolphins suffer from anthropogenic disruptions to the environment. Pollution, both from noise and plastics, is a common cause of higher mortality rates. Many can be, or have been, affected by entanglement in fishing nets and whaling. Risso's dolphins are currently protected in the United States, but they are still hunted in other parts of the world.

== Taxonomy ==
Risso's dolphin is named after Antoine Risso, whose study of the animal formed the basis of the recognized description by Georges Cuvier in 1812. The holotype referred to a specimen at the Muséum national d'histoire naturelle, an exhibit using preserved skin and skull obtained at Brest, France.

The type and sole species of the genus Grampus refers to Delphinus griseus Cuvier 1812. A proposition to name this genus Grampidelphis in 1933, when the taxonomic status of "blackfish" was uncertain, and conserving the extensive use of "Grampus" for the "killer" Orcinus orca", also suggested renaming this species (Grampidelphis exilis Iredale, T. & Troughton, E. le G. 1933). These were recognised as synonyms after publication of the Catalog of Whales (Hershkovitz, 1966).

Another common name for Risso's dolphin is grampus (also the species' genus), although this common name was more often used for the orca. The etymology of the word "grampus" is unclear. It may be an agglomeration of the Latin grandis piscis or French grand poisson, both meaning big fish. The specific epithet griseus refers to the mottled (almost scarred) grey colour of its body.

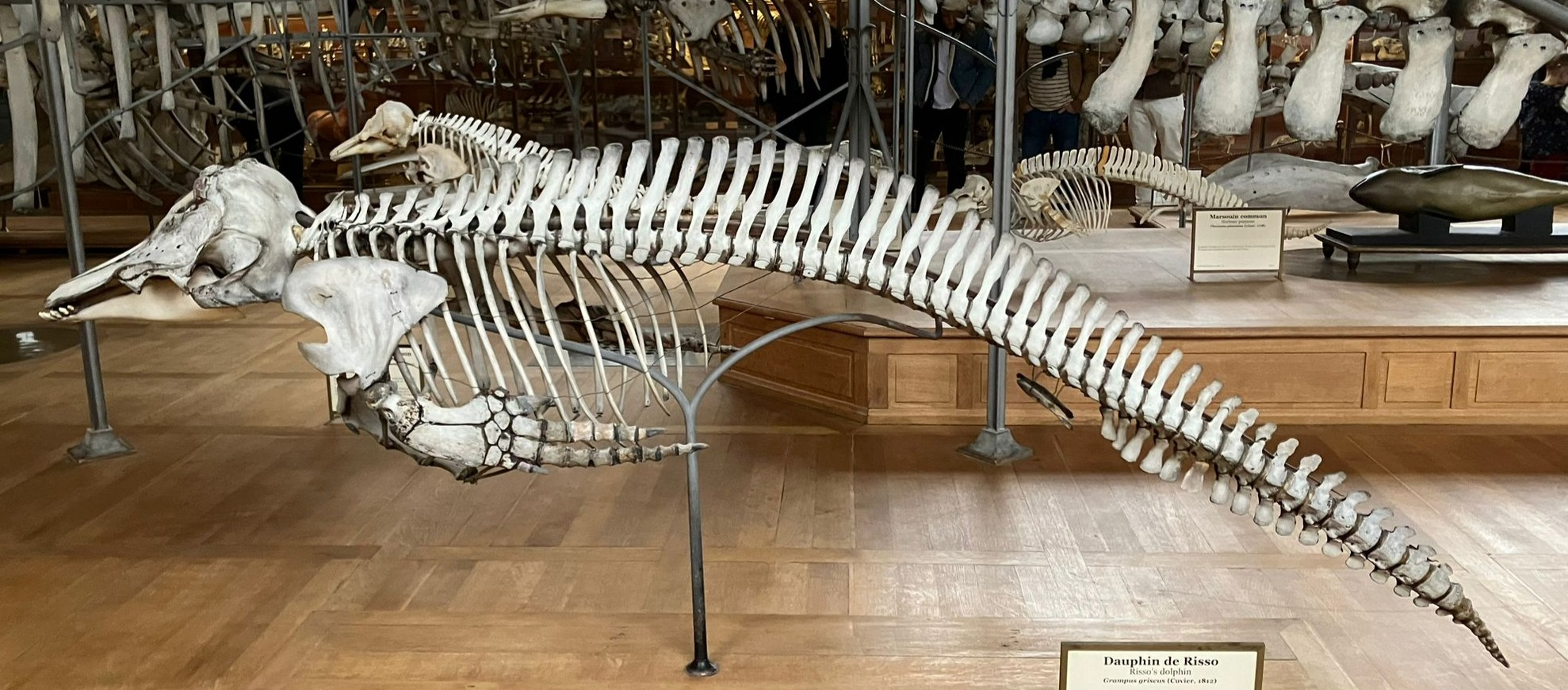
Holotype skeleton, at the MNHM^{.}

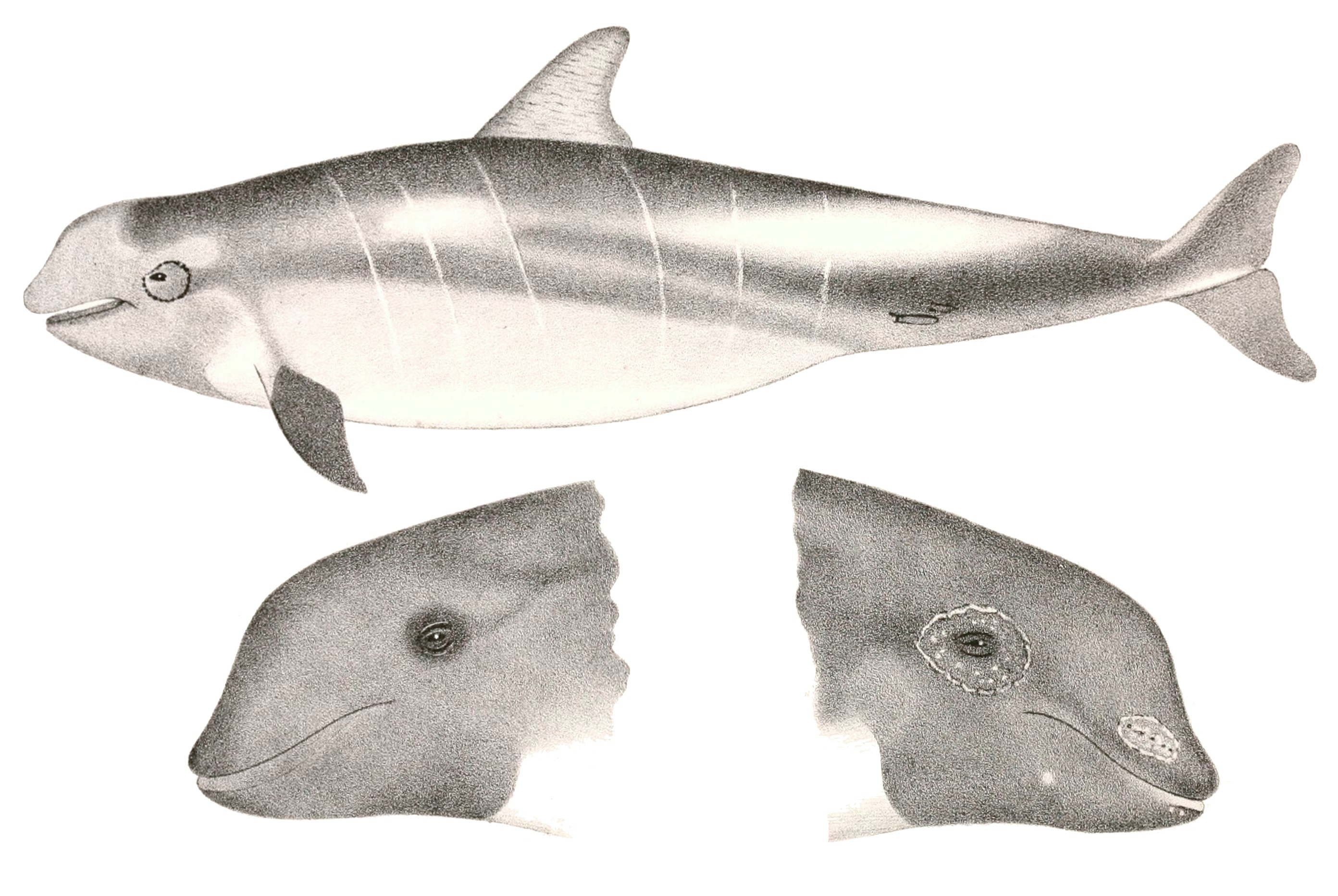
1876 illustrations by E. D. Cope

== Description ==
A three-dimensional model of a skeleton

Risso's dolphin has a relatively large anterior body and dorsal fin, while the posterior tapers to a relatively narrow tail. The bulbous shape of the head has a vertical crease in front.

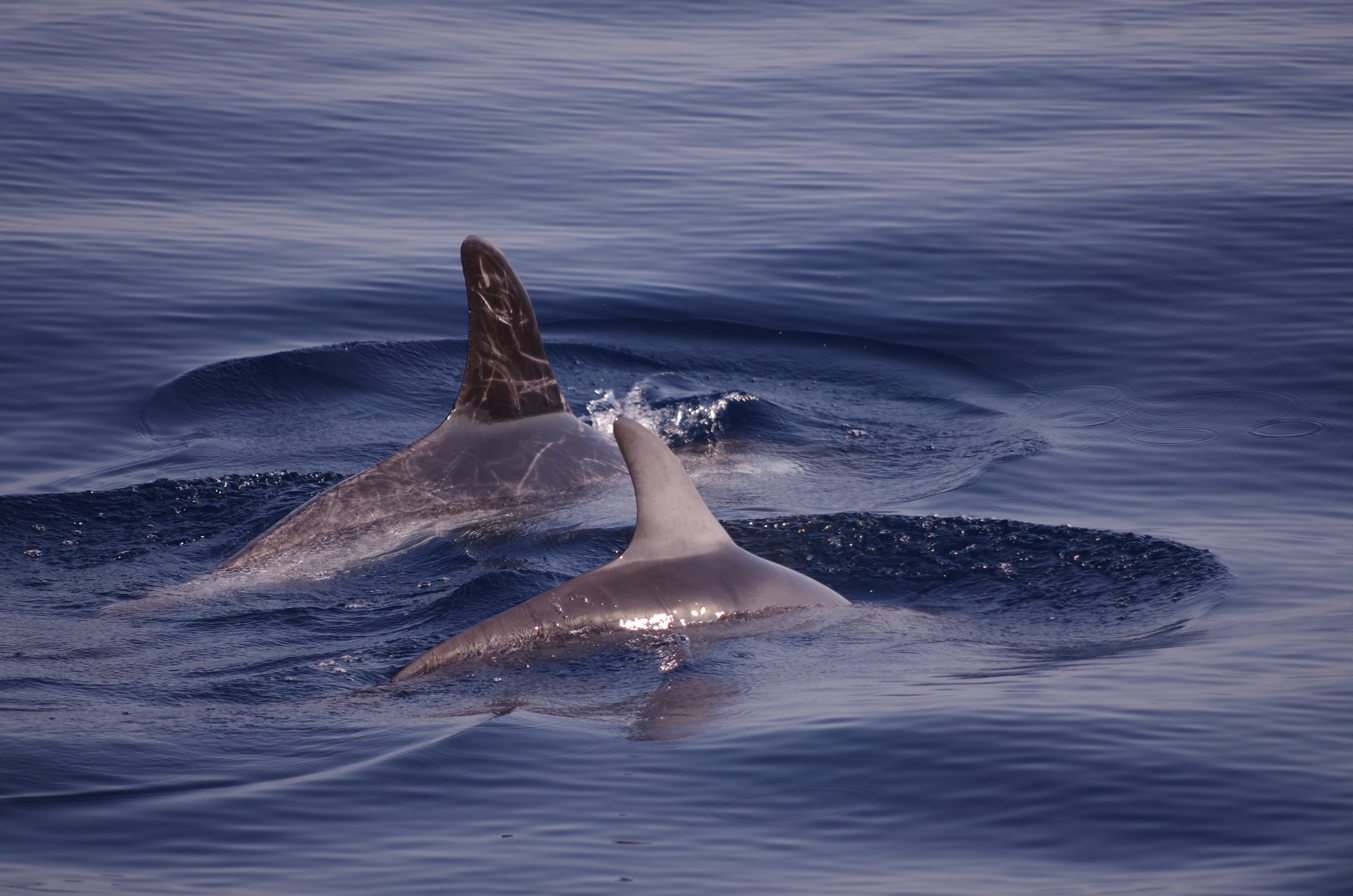
A calf bears no scars, in contrast to its mother behind it.

Infants are dorsally grey to brown and ventrally cream-colored, with a white, anchor-shaped area between the pectorals and around the mouth. In older calves, the nonwhite areas darken to nearly black, and then lighten (except for the always dark dorsal fin). Linear scars mostly from social interaction eventually cover the bulk of the body; scarring is a common feature of male-to-male competition in toothed whales, but Risso's dolphin tend to be unusually heavily scarred. The pronounced appearance of these scars results from the lack of repigmentation, which may be advantageous, as a display that reduces further challenges from other males. Older individuals appear mostly white. Most individuals have two to seven pairs of teeth, all in the lower jaw.

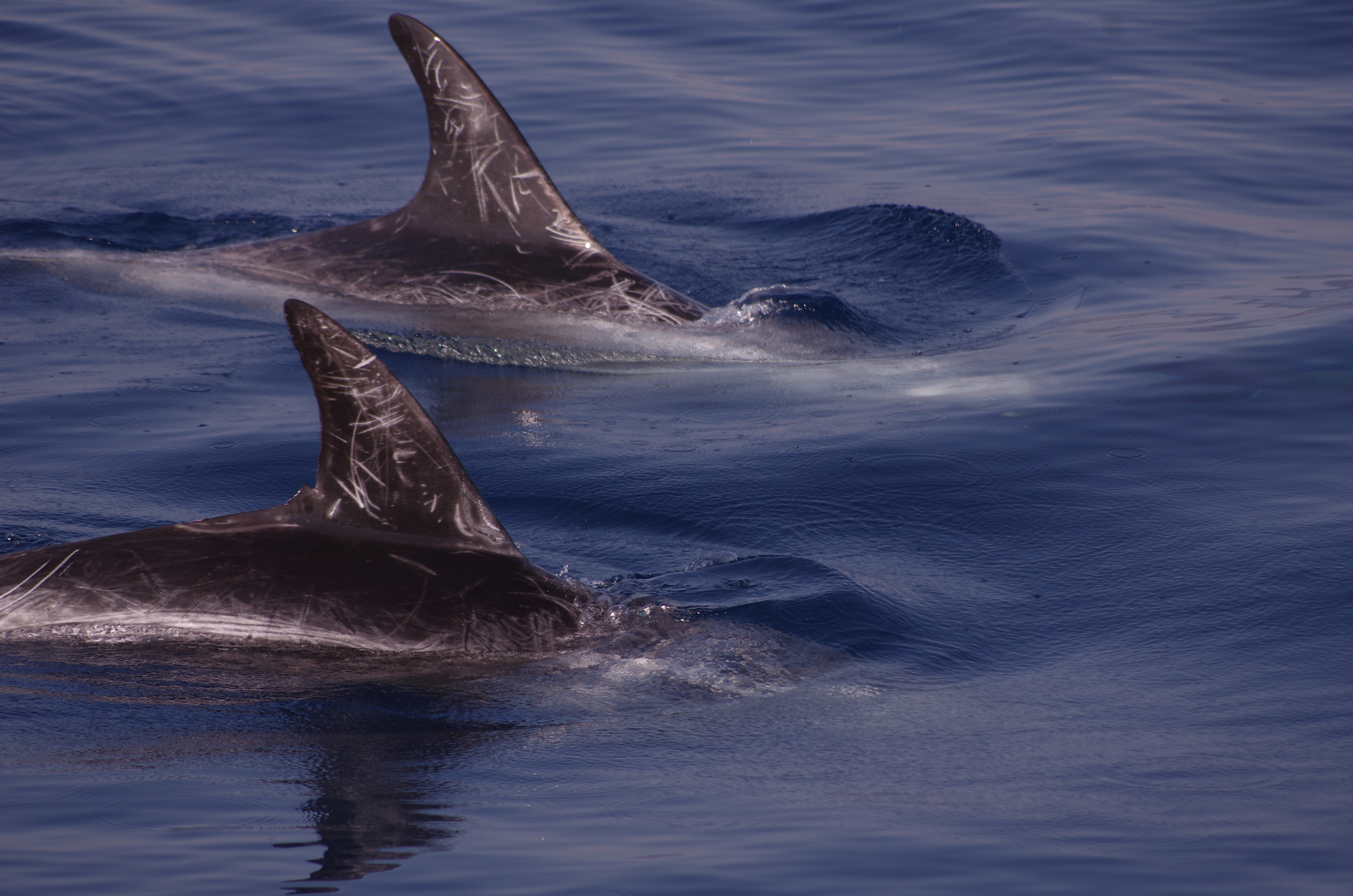
The scar patterns are so pronounced and persistent in this species that they can be used to distinguish individuals over a lifetime.

Length is typically 10 ft (3.0 m), although specimens may reach 13 ft (4.0 m). Like most dolphins, males are typically slightly larger than females. This species weighs 300–500 kg (660–1,100 lb), making it the largest species called "dolphin".

== Range and habitat ==
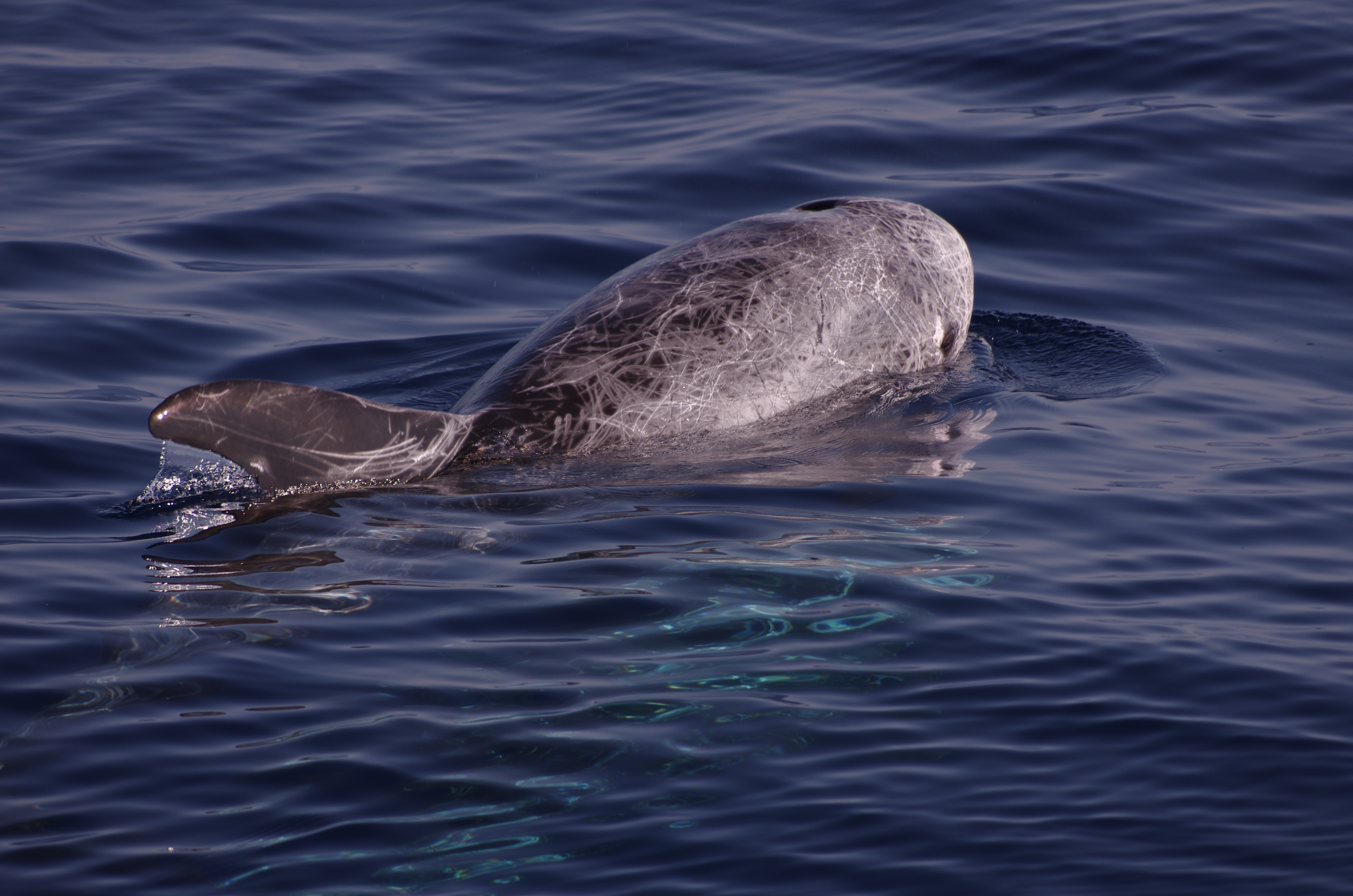
A Risso's dolphin in the Gulf of Genoa

Risso's dolphins are found nearly worldwide, from cold and temperate to tropical waters, in the Indian, Pacific and Atlantic Oceans, as well as parts of the Baltic Sea, the Persian Gulf, and the Mediterranean, North, and Red Seas (excepting the Black Sea; however, a rare stranding was recorded in the Sea of Marmara in 2012).). Several sightings have been documented in Roskilde Fjord, in the waters of Lejre Vig, just off of the coast of Skjoldungernes Land National Park, Denmark. Analysis of Risso's dolphins found in the UK and the Mediterranean display variations in mitochondrial DNA. One possible reason for these differences could be the lack of interaction between individuals in the two locations.

In the Pacific, they range from French Polynesia west to Samoa, north to the Hawaiian Islands, as far as the Gulf of Alaska. However, they are absent from the waters of the western Pacific (off of Asia) beyond Futuna. They are quite common along the western coasts of British Columbia, the United States, and Mexico, continuing their range to the southern tip of Tierra Del Fuego. In the eastern Atlantic, they have been sighted as far south as the offshore waters of Liberia, Guinea, and Western Africa north through the Canary Islands and the Azores to southern Greenland. On the western Atlantic side, Risso's dolphins have been seen as far south as Guyana and Martinique; they can be found throughout much of the Caribbean Sea and the Gulf of Mexico to Florida and the Bahamas, and all along the American East Coast and the Canadian Maritime Provinces.

Their preferred environment is just off the continental shelf, on steep banks, with water depths varying from 400–1,000 m (1,300–3,300 ft), and water temperatures at least 10 °C (50 °F) and preferably 15–20 °C (59–68 °F). They have been recorded diving to depths of 600 m (2,000 ft) in pursuit of prey.

Since at least 2017, Risso's dolphins have begun to appear off of the subarctic Norwegian coast, as far north as Bleik's Canyon, off of Andøya. The repeated, regular sightings imply an expansion of their natural range. Possible explanations for this movement are a changing climate or varying water currents, as well as a northward migration of prey species or competition with other cetaceans, such as pilot whales.

Due to the low population density of the species, Risso's dolphins are widely considered difficult to establish an accurate estimate of population size in any given area.

== Ecology ==
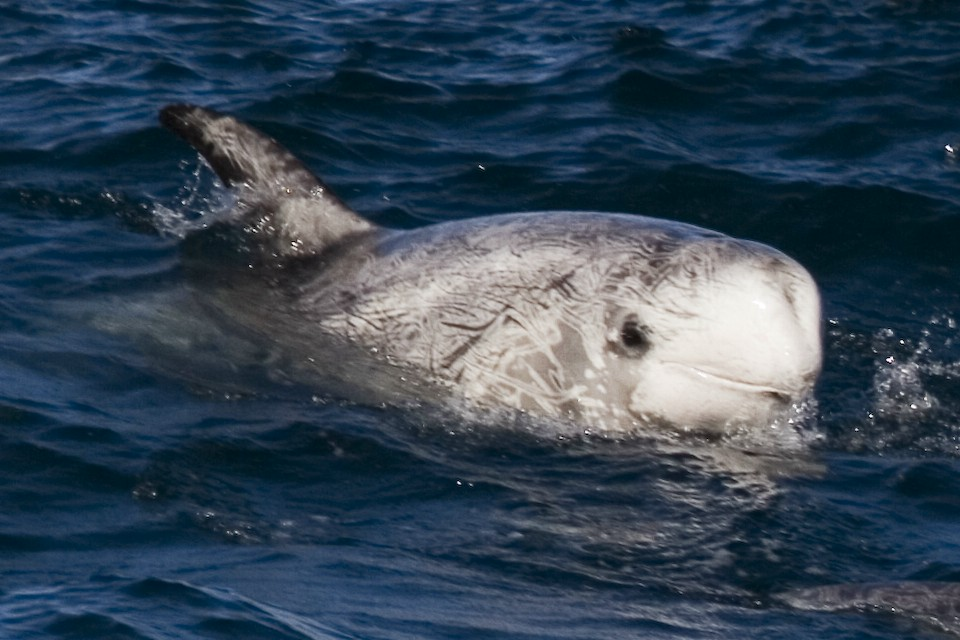
Risso's dolphin off Port San Luis, Harford Pier, at Avila Beach, California

They feed almost exclusively on neritic and oceanic squid, mostly nocturnally. Predation does not appear significant. Mass strandings are infrequent. Analysis carried out on the stomach contents of stranded specimens in Scotland showed that the most important species preyed on in Scottish waters is the curled octopus (Eledone cirrhosa).

A population is found off Santa Catalina Island, where they are sympatric with short-finned pilot whales (Globicephala macrorhynchus), and both species feed on the squid population. Although these species have not been seen to interact with each other, they take advantage of the commercial squid fishing that takes place at night. They have been seen by fishermen to feed around their boats. They also travel with other cetaceans. They surf the bow waves of gray whales, as well as ocean swells.

Risso's dolphins have a stratified social organisation. These dolphins typically travel in groups of between 10 and 51, but can sometimes form "super-pods" reaching up to a few thousand individuals. Smaller, stable subgroups exist within larger groups. These groups tend to be similar in age or sex. Risso's experience fidelity towards their groups. Long-term bonds are seen to correlate with adult males. Younger individuals experience less fidelity and can leave and join groups. Mothers show a high fidelity towards a group of mother and calves, but whether or not these females stay together after their calves leave or remain in their natal pods is unclear.

== Behavior ==
Natural Resources Wales work on the conservation of Risso's dolphins around Bardsey Island, Wales

=== Feeding ===
Like many dolphin species, they use echolocation to target cephalopods and fish that are feeding below. Tagging of a population in the Azores revealed that Grampus griseus plans whether to make a shallow or deep dive, with different strategies that create profitable foraging for the considerable expenditure in time and energy. Risso's can achieve depths over 600 m (2,000 ft) by exhausting their lungs and using several spins to rapidly descend, almost vertically, and increase the time spent foraging. This allows the species to exploit a deep and dispersed layer of prey such as squid, those taking refuge during daylight when they become more vulnerable to predation. When feeding in shallow depths, however, Risso's can experience competition from other cetaceans.

=== Social behavior ===
Breaching, in California

Risso's dolphins are known to have a very active surface presence, often either displaying their tail flukes and pectoral fins, or slapping the surface of the water. They have also been known to engage in a behavior called spy-hopping, a common behavior in cetaceans where an individual vertically pokes its head out of the water. Recent studies have discussed the possibilities of spy-hopping as a sexual behavior, as it is typically only done in the presence of other individuals. Risso's dolphins do not require cutting teeth to process their cephalopod prey, which has allowed the species to evolve teeth as display weapons in mating conflicts.

=== Reproduction ===
Juvenile with adult, in the Canary Islands

Gestation requires an estimated 13–14 months, at intervals of 2.4 years. Calving reaches seasonal peaks in the winter in the eastern Pacific and in the summer and fall in the western Pacific. Females mature sexually at ages 8–10, and males at age 10–12. The oldest specimen reached 39.6 years.

Risso's dolphins have successfully been taken into captivity in Japan and the United States, although not with the regularity of bottlenose dolphins or orcas.

Recent studies have shown a possibility of hybridization occurrences between Risso's dolphins and bottlenose dolphins. So far, possible hybrid individuals have been documented in United Kingdom waters. Hybridization is not uncommon with cetaceans, so these hybrids likely do not have any evolutionary advantage, but instead are more likely an uncommon chance event.

=== Human interactions ===
Like other dolphins and marine animals, these dolphins getting caught in seine nets and gillnets have been documented across the globe. Many of these incidents have resulted in death. Small whaling operations have also been cause of some of these deaths. Pollution has also affected many individuals that have ingested plastic. Samples from these animals show contamination within their tissues.

Increasing oceanic noise due to human presence threatens populations of Risso's dolphins. The intensity of anthropogenic noise can push dolphins to strand themselves and to leave their typical habitats. Evidence shows that motorized vessels create low-frequency noise that disrupts typical acoustic behavior, which is measured by the regular click trains, buzzes, pulses, and barks. The click trains produced by Risso's dolphins are necessary for them to navigate through their environment and identify prey. Barks are more often used in social settings.

In Ireland, though not apparently in England, Risso's dolphin was one of the royal fish, which by virtue of the royal prerogative, were the exclusive property of the English Crown.

A famed individual named Pelorus Jack was widely reported between 1888 and 1912, travelling with ships navigating the Cook Strait in New Zealand. A law protecting the animal was passed after a public outcry, renewed twice more, but suggested be invalid by its reference to fisheries acts that did not concern marine mammals.

== Conservation ==
Risso's dolphin populations of the North, Baltic, and Mediterranean Seas are listed on Appendix II of the Convention on the Conservation of Migratory Species of Wild Animals (CMS), since they have an unfavourable conservation status or would benefit significantly from international co-operation organised by tailored agreements.

In addition, Risso's dolphin is covered by the Agreement on the Conservation of Small Cetaceans of the Baltic, North East Atlantic, Irish and North Seas (ASCOBANS), the Agreement on the Conservation of Cetaceans in the Black Sea, Mediterranean Sea and Contiguous Atlantic Area (ACCOBAMS), the Memorandum of Understanding for the Conservation of Cetaceans and Their Habitats in the Pacific Islands Region (Pacific Cetaceans MoU) and the Memorandum of Understanding Concerning the Conservation of the Manatee and Small Cetaceans of Western Africa and Macaronesia (Western African Aquatic Mammals MoU).

Risso's dolphins are protected in the United States under the Marine Mammal Protection Act of 1992. Currently, Japan, Indonesia, the Solomon Islands, and The Lesser Antilles hunt Risso's dolphins.

== Strandings ==
At least one case report of strandings in Japan's Goto Islands has been associated with parasitic neuropathy of the eighth cranial nerve by a trematode in the genus Nasitrema. A juvenile male Risso's dolphin reportedly was stranded alive on the coast of Gran Canaria on 26 April 2019. This was the first documented case of capture myopathy and stress cardiomyopathy in a male juvenile Risso's dolphin that has received rehabilitation.
