= Rodanstown Motte =

Archaeological site in Ireland

- Móta Bhaile Uí Rodáin (Irish)
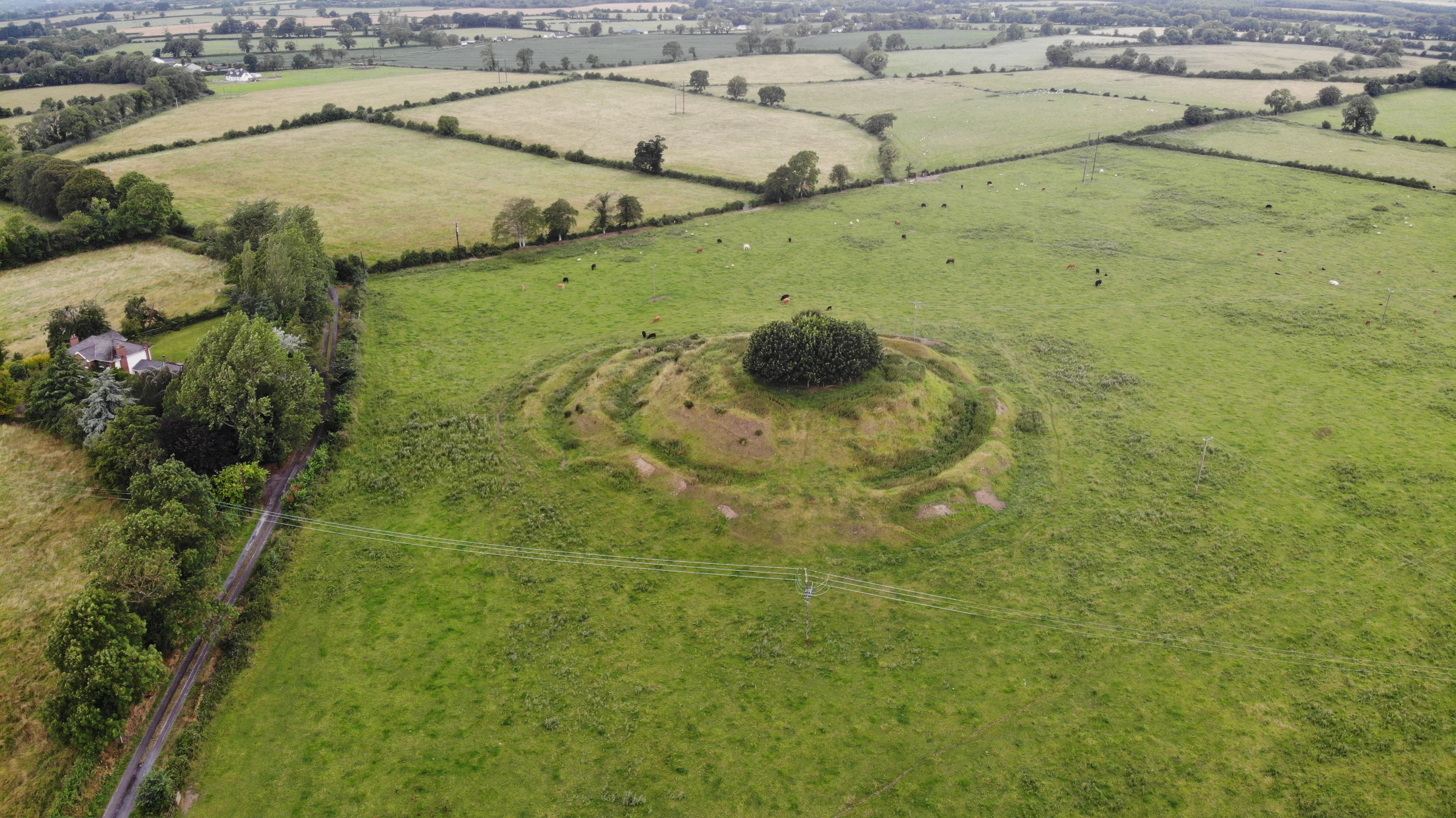

- Location within Ireland
- 53°25′04″N 6°38′40″W
- Type: Motte
- Periods: Gaelic Ireland
- Location: Rodanstown, County Meath, Ireland

History
- Built: 11th century AD?

Site notes
- Material: earth
- Diameter: 82 metres (269 ft)
- Circumference: 260 metres (850 ft)
- Public access: None

Rodanstown Motte is a medieval archaeological site located in County Meath, Ireland.

== Location ==
Rodanstown Motte is 2.5 km (1.6 mi) northeast of Kilcock.

== Description ==
Rodanstown Motte is "one of the best surviving examples of Norman defensive earthworks in Ireland." It is a multivallate ringfort. The trees on its top are sycamores.
