= R125 road (Ireland) =

Road in Ireland

R125 road
- Bóthar R125
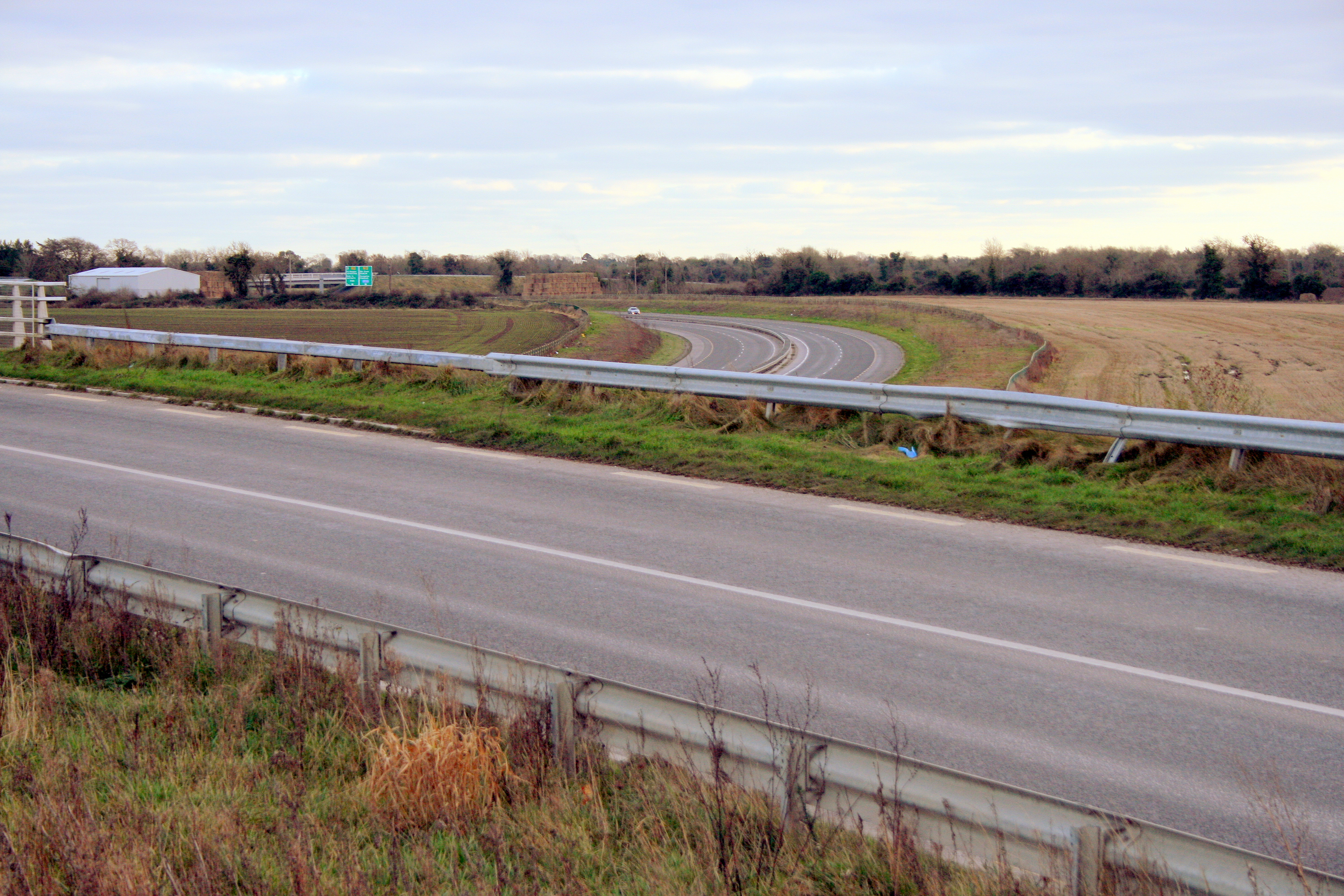
- R125 crossing the N2

Route information
- Length: 39 km (24 mi)

Location
- Country: Ireland
- Primary destinations: County Meath; Kilcock - leaves the R148 on the village Main Street at the Kildare/Meath border; Mullagh – (R156); Crosskeys - joins/leaves the (R154); Drumree; Dunshaughlin - crosses the R147; Ratoath - (R155); Crosses over the M2 (no junction); (R148); (R130); County Dublin; (R122); (R108); Swords - terminates at Main St, Swords

Highway system
- Roads in Ireland; Motorways; Primary; Secondary; Regional

The R125 road is a regional road in Ireland, linking Kilcock on the County Meath / County Kildare border to Swords in County Dublin via the towns of Dunshaughlin and Ratoath.

The official description of the R125 from the Roads Act 1993 (Classification of Regional Roads) Order 2012 reads:

R125: Swords, County Dublin - Dunshaughlin County Meath - Kilcock, County Kildare

Between its junction with M1 at Drinan and its junction with R132 at Miltonsfield via Crowscastle all in the county of Fingal

and

between its junction with R132 at Newtown in the county of Fingal and its junction with R147 at Main Street in the town of Dunshauglin in the county of Meath via Balheary Road, Watery Lane and Rathbeale Road in the town of Swords; Rathbeal, Roganstown, Tonlagee, Lispopple Cross, Killossery and Newbarn in the county of Fingal: Dun Bridge at the boundary between the county of Fingal and the county of Meath: Greenoge, Baltrasna, Ratoath and Grangend Common in the county of Meath

and

between its junction with R147 at Cooksland and its junction with R154 at Merrywell via Readsland, Knocks and Kilcooly all in the county of Meath

and

between its junction with R154 at Augherskea in the county of Meath and its junction with R148 at The Square in the town of Kilcock in the county of Kildare via Mullagh and Calgath in the county of Meath: and County Meath Bridge at the boundary between the county of Meath and the county of Kildare

and

between its junction with R148 at Harbour Street in the town of Kilcock and its junction with R407 at Duncreevan in the county of Kildare via Canal Bridge and Molly Ware Street at Kilcock in the county of Kildare.

The route is 39 km long.

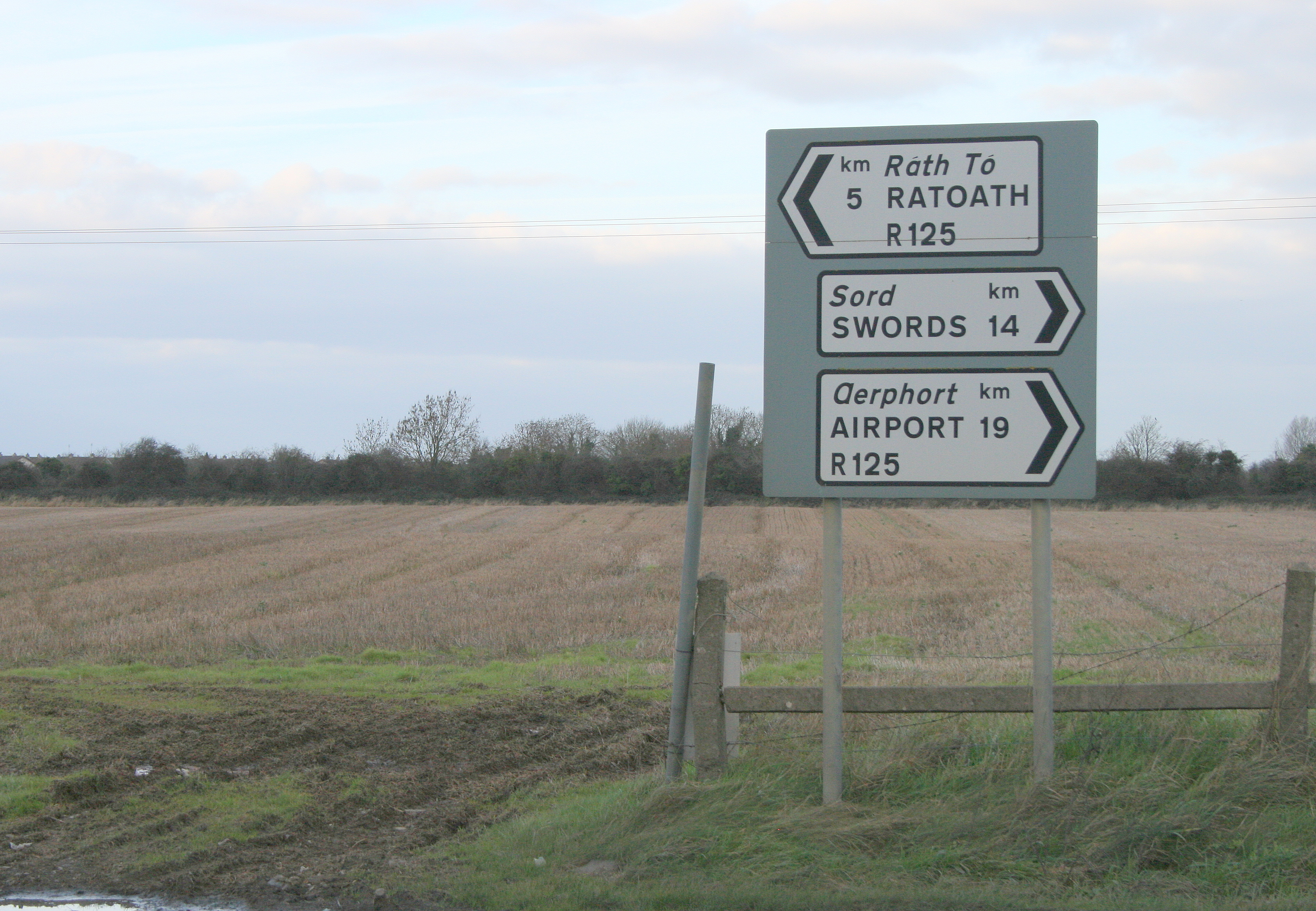

== See also ==
- Roads in Ireland
- National primary road
- National secondary road
- Regional road
