= Ratoath =

Town in County Meath, Ireland

Ratoath Ráth Tó
- Town
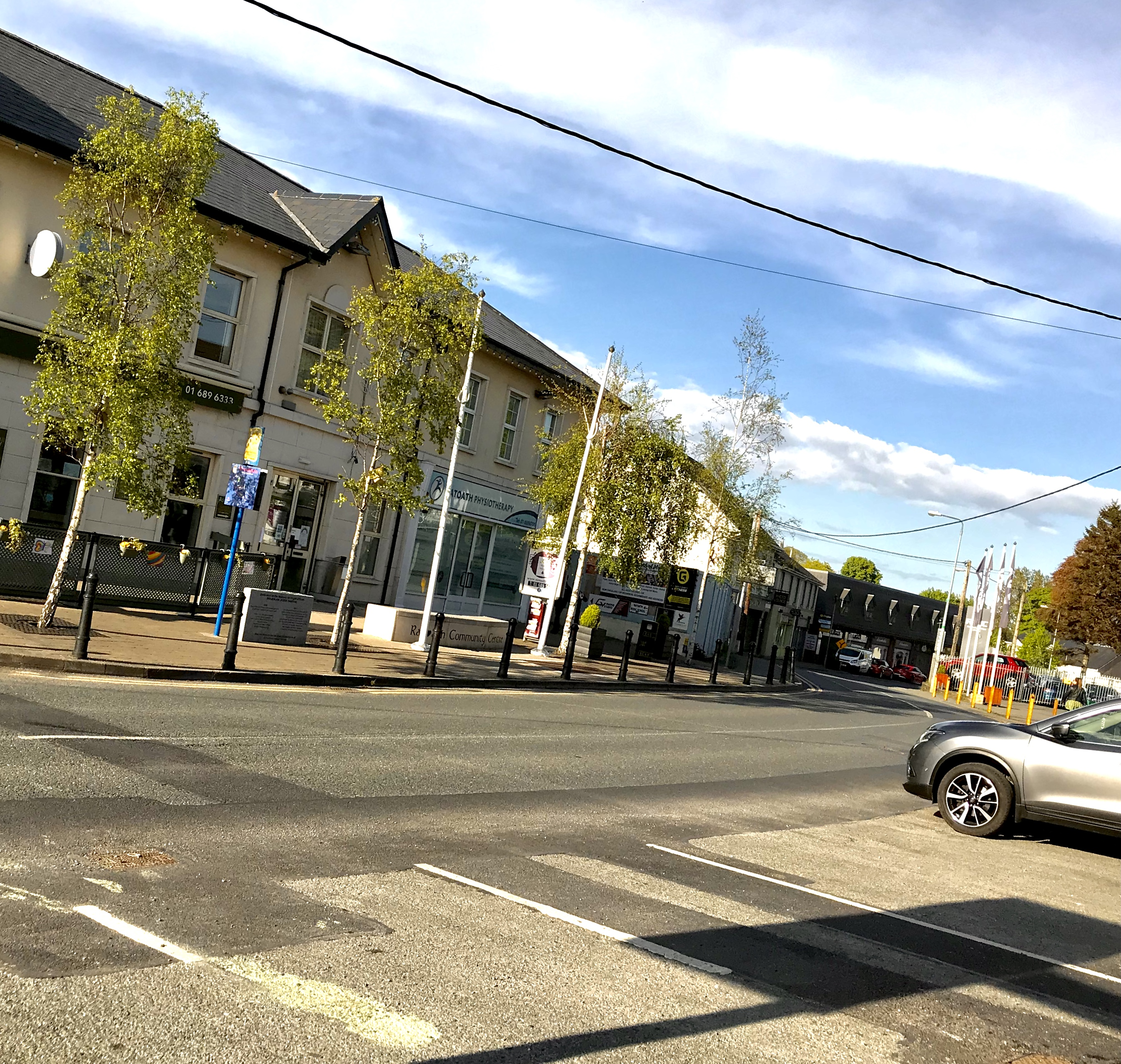
- Main Street in May 2020

- Location in Ireland
- Coordinates: 53.506°N 6.463°W
- Country: Ireland
- Province: Leinster
- County: County Meath
- Elevation: 90 m (300 ft)

Population (2022)
  - Total: 10,077
- Time zone: UTC±0 (WET)
  - Summer (DST): UTC+1 (IST)
- Eircode routing key: A85
- Telephone area code: +353(0)1
- Irish Grid Reference: O016519

Ratoath (Irish: Ráth Tó, meaning 'Tó's ringfort') is a commuter town in County Meath, Ireland. A branch of the Broad Meadow Water (Broadmeadow River) (Irish: An Gabhair) flows through the town. The R125 and R155 roads meet in the village. At the 2022 census, there were 10,007 people living in Ratoath, making it the fourth largest urban area in Meath. The town is around 25 kilometres (16 mi) northwest of Dublin city centre.

== Name ==
Ratoath gives its name to a village, a townland, a parish, a civil parish, an electoral division and to the barony of Ratoath. The derivation or meaning of the word is uncertain. Two alternative Irish forms are cited: Ráth-Tógh and Ráth-Tábhachta. These place names occur in Irish manuscripts and scholars say that the writers were referring to Ratoath; it seems that they were trying to give a phonetic rendering of a name that was unfamiliar to them. Mruigtuaithe occurs in the Book of Armagh as the name of one of these places in Meath where Saint Patrick founded a church and Eoin MacNeill identifies it as Ratoath. If this is correct it would seem that the second portion of the word comes from the Irish word tuath which means a territory belonging to a family or sept. Mruig means a grazing plain. Ráth is the Irish for a ringfort.

There is evidence that it was already spelt Ratoath in 1392 when Walter Kerdiff of the town sued Sir Walter Cusack for debt. In a royal grant of the manor of Ratoath to Sir Robert Bold, later Baron Ratoath, in 1468, it was described as Rathonth. On the other hand, a statute of the Parliament of Ireland of 1450, permitting Richard of York, the Lord Lieutenant of Ireland, to hold a market there, calls it Ratoath.

== Population and demographics ==
Historical population
Year	Pop.	±%
1991	593	—
1996	1,061	+78.9%
2002	3,794	+257.6%
2006	7,249	+91.1%
2011	9,043	+24.7%
2016	9,533	+5.4%
2022	10,077	+5.7%

In the period between the 1996 and 2022 census, the population of Ratoath increased 10-fold, from 1,061 to 10,077. According to the 2016 census report, 87% of the town's houses (2,437 of 2,790 households) were constructed between 1991 and 2010.

Ratoath is a commuter town with most of its adult population commuting to Dublin to work. More than three-quarters of the population travel to work by car. In 2011, 10.9% of the workforce was unemployed compared to the national average of 19%. As of 2011, social class A, employers and managers constituted 717 of the 2,751 households.

In April 2011, Ratoath had a population of 9,043, consisting of 4,520 males and 4,523 females. The population of pre-school age (0–4) was 1,158, of primary school age (5–12) was 1,582 and of secondary school age (13–18) was 724. There were 313 persons aged 65 years and over. The number of persons aged 18 years or over was 5,677. Non-Irish nationals accounted for 9.7 per cent of the population of Ratoath in 2011 compared with a national average figure of 12.0 per cent. UK nationals (168 persons) were the largest group, followed by Lithuanians (120 persons). 3,676 persons could speak the Irish language and of these 1,702 spoke the language daily. 1,025 persons spoke a language other than Irish or English at home and of these 137 could not speak English well or at all. French was the most common foreign language spoken at home with 131 speakers. There were 7,843 Roman Catholics in the area at census time. A further 649 were adherents of other stated religions, while 420 persons indicated that they had no religion.

== Education ==
Ratoath is the home of two primary schools; Ratoath National School and St. Paul's National School. It also has its own secondary school called Ratoath College which was founded in 2005. Originally located on a temporary basis on the Fairyhouse Racecourse, the school eventually moved to its permanent location in Jamestown in 2007. The building received an extension in 2021.

In 2010, a gaelscoil was opened in Ratoath despite not receiving official recognition by the Department of Education. The following year, it was announced that Gaelscoil Ráth Tó would close, and would merge with a newly established gaelscoil in the neighbouring town of Ashbourne. This new school would be named Gaelscoil na Mí. As of 2022, the site of the former gaelscoil is now a physiotherapy clinic.

== Amenities ==
While Ratoath has several shops on its main street, including a supermarket, two pubs and several restaurants, the growth in the population of Ratoath as a commuter town has not been matched by the development of amenities.

As of 2022, Ratoath is the largest town in the Republic of Ireland without a Garda station.

== Sport ==
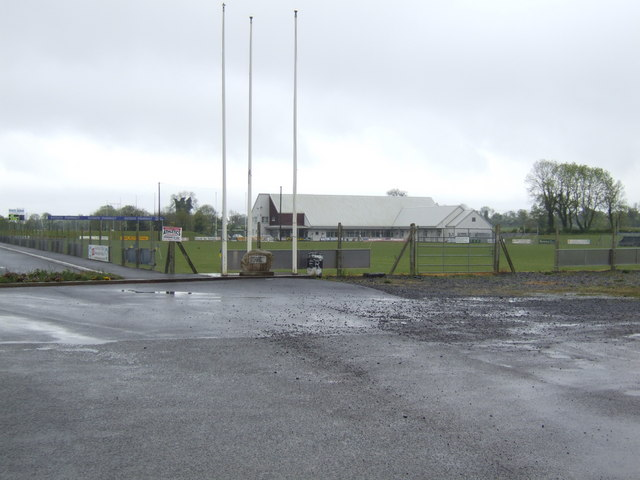
Sean Eiffe Park, the Ratoath GAA grounds

Just outside the town is the horse racing track Fairyhouse Racecourse, where the Irish Grand National is held. Ratoath has a long history of horse racing, with many jockeys coming from the area.

In 2016, for the first time in their history, Ratoath GAA hurlers got into a Leinster final after they defeated Rosenallis. The club comprises approximately 50 teams across all codes/age groups, which play in the Meath/Leinster Senior Men's Football & Hurling and Ladies' Senior Camogie and Intermediate Football championships.

Ratoath GAA have won the Meath Senior Football Championship three times (2019, 2020, 2022) after first joining the senior ranks in 2016.

== Notable people ==
- Jonathan Browne, racing driver

== See also ==
- Barony of Ratoath
- Ratoath (Parliament of Ireland constituency)
- List of towns and villages in Ireland
