= Drumree =

Village in County Meath, Ireland

Coordinates: 53°30′27″N 6°34′41″W

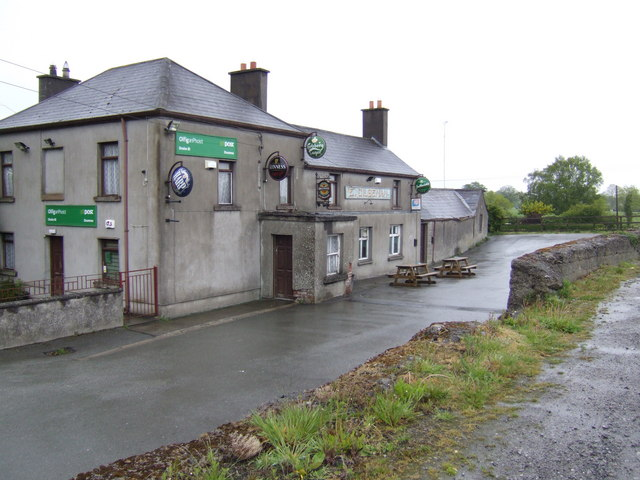
Post office and pub at Drumree

Drumree (Irish: Droim an Rí, meaning 'Hill of the King') is a settled area in the civil parish of Knockmark, south County Meath, Ireland, south of Dunsany and approximately 26 kilometres (16 mi) from Dublin city centre. The next nearest settlement was the hamlet at Dunsany Cross Roads.

Lord Dunsany lived at Dunsany Castle to the north for much of his life, and Drumree Railway Station was his local station.

== Transport ==
Drumree railway station on the Dublin–Navan railway line opened on 29 August 1862, closed for passenger traffic on 27 January 1947, closed for goods traffic on 12 June 1961, and finally closed altogether on 1 April 1963.

== See also ==
- Warrenstown College
