= Richard Meredith =

Richard Meredith may refer to:

- Richard Meredith (bishop) (died 1597), Church of Ireland bishop
- Sir Richard Meredith, 2nd Baronet (died 1679), MP for Kent
- Richard C. Meredith (1937–1979), American science fiction author
- Richard Meredith (author) (born 1948), British travel writer
- Richard Meredith (ice hockey) (1932–2025), American ice hockey player
- Richard Meredith (New Zealand politician) (1843–1918), New Zealand politician
- Richard Meredith-Hardy (born 1957), British pilot
- Richard Edmund Meredith (1855–1916), Irish jurist
- Richard Martin Meredith (1847–1934), Canadian jurist
- Richard Meredith (priest) (1559–1621), Dean of Wells 1607–1621
