= List of organists and assistant organists of Bath Abbey =

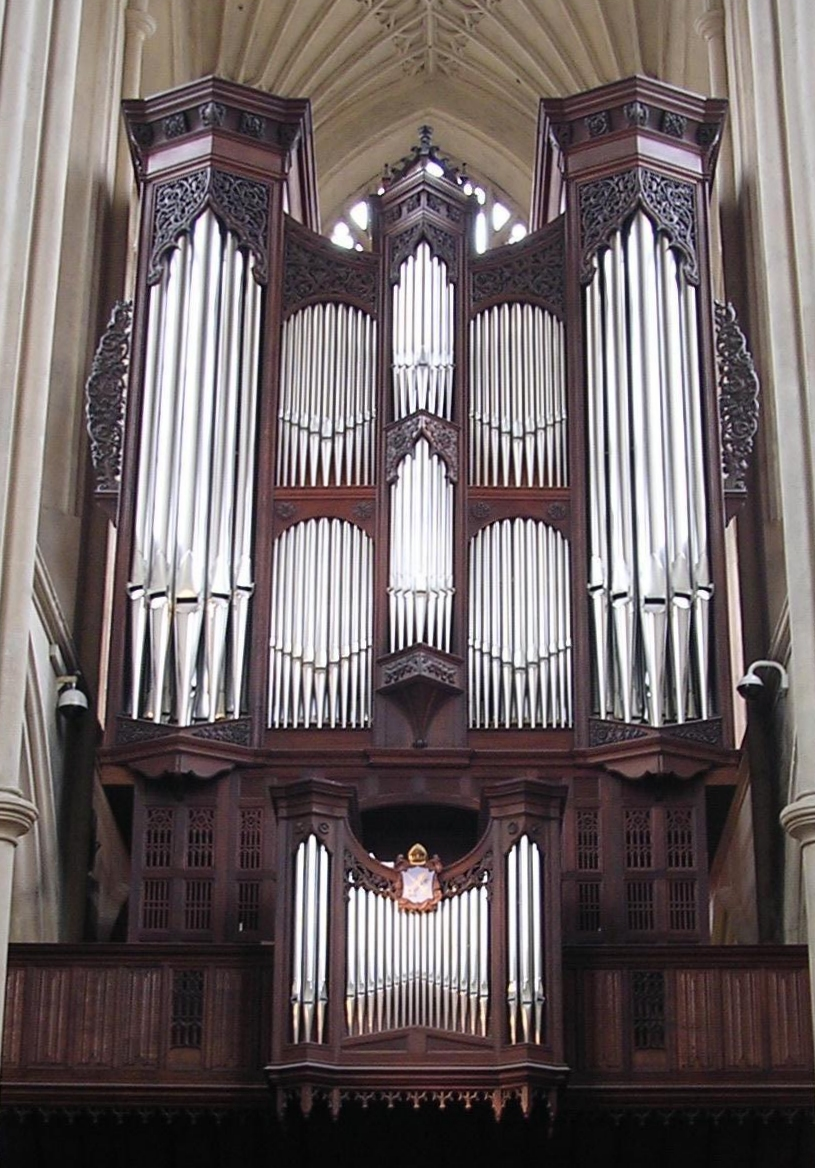
Organ, in north transept

The Abbey Church of Saint Peter and Saint Paul, Bath, commonly known as Bath Abbey, is an Anglican parish church and a former Benedictine monastery in Bath, Somerset, England.

It has had several organs since the first was installed in 1634 and multiple organists and assistant organists since the 16th century.

== Organs ==
The first mention of an organ in the Abbey dates to 1634, but nothing is known of this instrument. The first properly recorded organ in Bath Abbey was built by Abraham Jordan in 1708. It was modified in 1718 and 1739 by Jordan's son. The specification recorded in 1800 was one of twenty stops spread over three manuals. The abbey's next organ was built in 1836 by John Smith of Bristol, to a specification of thirty stops over three manuals and pedals. This instrument was rebuilt on a new gallery in the North Transept by William Hill & Son of London in 1868, to a specification of forty stops spread over four manuals and pedals, although the Solo department, which would have brought the total to well over forty, was not completed.

A new organ was supplied to the abbey in 1895 by Norman and Beard of Norwich. It had 52 stops spread over four manuals and pedals. It was again rebuilt in 1930, and then by Hill, Norman and Beard in 1948, which brought the number of stops to 58. In 1972 this was increased to a total of 65 speaking stops. The organ was totally reconstructed in 1997 by Klais Orgelbau of Bonn, retaining the existing instrument as far as was possible and restoring it largely to its 1895 condition, although the Positive division was kept. The instrument as it now stands has 63 speaking stops over four manuals and pedals.

=== Continuo organ ===
A four-stop continuo organ was built for the abbey in 1999 by Northampton-based organ builder Kenneth Tickell. The instrument, contained in a case of dark oak, is portable, and can be tuned to three pitches: A=440 Hz (modern concert pitch), A=415 Hz and A=486 Hz. A lever pedal can reduce the stops sounding to only the 8' stop and, when released, returns the organ to the registration in use before it was depressed. A page about similar instruments on the builder's website can be found here.

=== Directors of Music ===
- William Cupper ???? – 1539
- John Dodwell 1701
- George Griffeth ca 1703
- Abraham Jordan 1709 – 1710
- Thomas Dean 1710 – 1711
- Josiah Priest 1711 – 1726
- Thomas Chilcot 1726 – 1766
- Joseph Tylee 1767 – 1794
- Thomas Field 1795 – 1831
- Charles Milsom 1832 – 1839
- James Kendrick Pyne 1839 – 1892
- Albert Edward New 1890 – 1933
- Ernest Walter Maynard 1933 – 1967
- John Dudley Holroyd 1967 – 1985
- Peter King 1986 - 2016
- Shean Bowers (Interim) 2016 - 2017
- Huw Williams 2017-

=== Organists ===
- Shean Bowers 2017–2022

=== Assistant organists ===
- Raymond Jones 1935 – 1975 (Teacher and Organist of a Church destroyed in 1942 air raid)
- Marcus Sealy 1974 – 2005 (then Sub-Organist)
- Mark Swinton 2005 – 2008
- Gary Desmond 2008 – 2010 (post abolished upon creation of new post for Assistant Director of Music)
- Dewi Rees 2023 – 2025 (post reinstated)

=== Sub Organists ===
- Marcus Sealy 2005 -2017

=== Assistant Directors of Music ===
- Shean Bowers 2010–2022

=== Sub-Organist and Assistant Directors of Music ===
- Adam Field 2025–present

=== Organ Scholars ===
- David Bryson 2021–22
- Alex Hemple 2023–24
- Gavin Phelps 2024–25
- Frankie Tempest 2025–present
