= Bath Abbey =

Church in Somerset, England

- Abbey Church of Saint Peter and Saint Paul
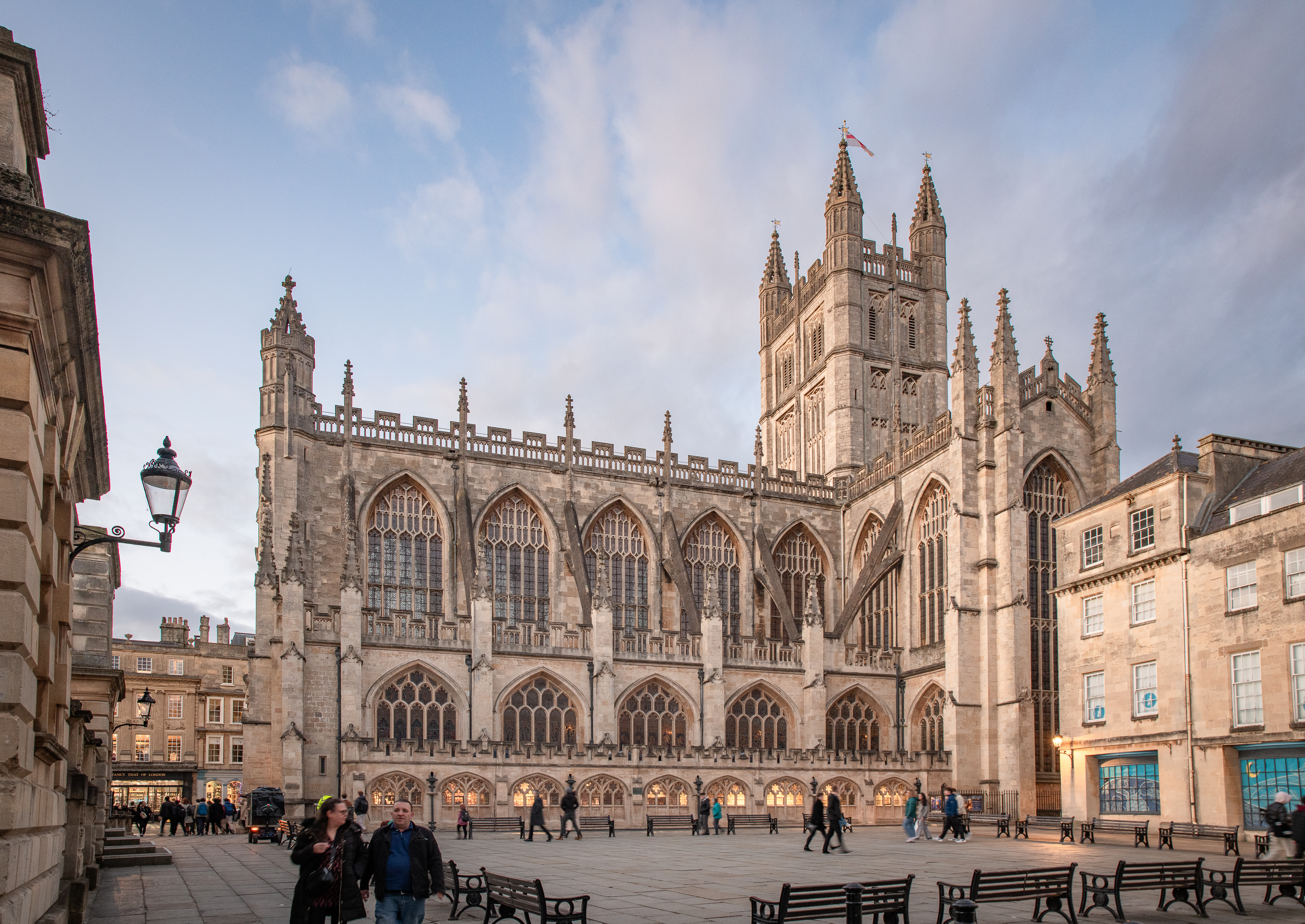
- Bath Abbey, UK, photographed from a south-westerly position

- Location within Somerset
- 51°22′53″N 02°21′32″W
- OS grid reference: ST 75127 64769
- Location: Bath, Somerset
- Country: England
- Denomination: Church of England
- Previous denomination: Roman Catholic
- Churchmanship: Low Church
- Website: www.bathabbey.org

History
- Status: Active
- Dedication: Saint Peter and Saint Paul

Architecture
- Heritage designation: Grade I
- Designated: 12 June 1950
- Architect(s): William Vertue, Robert Vertue, George Gilbert Scott, George Phillips Manners
- Architectural type: Parish church
- Style: Perpendicular Gothic
- Years built: 1499–1611
- Groundbreaking: 675
- Completed: 1611

Specifications
- Capacity: 1,200
- Length: 220 feet (67 m)
- Width: 22 feet (6.7 m)
- Materials: Bath stone

Administration
- Diocese: Bath and Wells
- Parish: Bath Abbey with St James

Clergy
- Bishop: Michael Beasley
- Rector: Revd Prebendary Guy Bridgewater
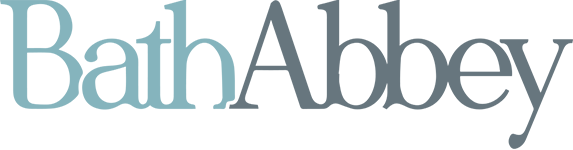

The Abbey Church of Saint Peter and Saint Paul, commonly known as Bath Abbey, is a parish church of the Church of England and former Benedictine monastery in Bath, Somerset, England. Founded in the 7th century, it was reorganised in the 10th century and rebuilt in the 12th and 16th centuries; major restoration work was carried out by Sir George Gilbert Scott in the 1860s. It is one of the most significant examples of Perpendicular Gothic architecture in the West Country. The medieval abbey church served as a sometime cathedral of a bishop. After long contention between churchmen in Bath and Wells the seat of the Diocese of Bath and Wells was later consolidated at Wells Cathedral. The Benedictine community was dissolved in 1539 during the Dissolution of the Monasteries.

The church architecture is cruciform in plan and can seat up to 1,200 people. An active place of worship, it also hosts civic ceremonies, concerts and lectures. There is a museum in the cellars.

The abbey is a Grade I listed building, particularly noted for its fan vaulting. It contains war memorials for the local population and monuments to several notable people, in the form of wall and floor plaques and commemorative stained glass. The church has two organs and a peal of ten bells. The west front includes sculptures of angels climbing to heaven on two stone ladders, representing Jacob's Ladder.

== History ==
=== Early history ===
In 675 AD, Osric, King of the Hwicce, granted the Abbess Berta or Bertana 100 hides near Bath for the establishment of a convent. This religious house became a monastery under the patronage of the Bishop of Worcester. King Offa of Mercia successfully wrested "that most famous monastery at Bath" from the bishop in 781. William of Malmesbury tells that Offa rebuilt the monastic church, which may have occupied the site of an earlier pagan temple, to such a standard that King Eadwig was moved to describe it as being "marvellously built". In 944 Folcwin reformed the Abbey of Saint Bertin in France along Benedictine lines and monks who opposed the reform fled to England. King Edmund I gave them the church at Bath, which was then in royal hands. Little is known about the architecture of this first building on the site. Monasticism in England had declined by that time, but Eadwig's brother Edgar (who was crowned "King of the English" at the abbey in 973) began its revival on his accession to the throne in 959. He encouraged monks to adopt the Rule of Saint Benedict, which was introduced at Bath under Abbot Ælfheah (St. Alphege), who also repaired the church. Sometime in the 10th century, as a result of the monastic reforms of Oswald and Dunstan, the monastic community of the site was re-established as a Benedictine monastery, which it remained until the Dissolution of the Monasteries in the 16th century.

=== Norman Conquest to the Dissolution ===
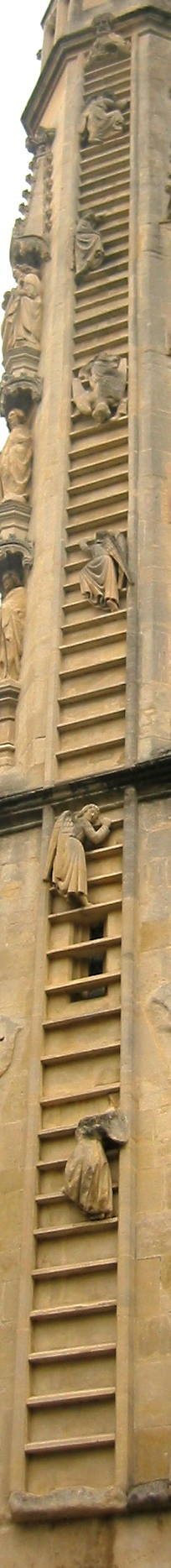
On the west front, angels climb Jacob's Ladder

Bath was ravaged in the power struggle between the sons of William the Conqueror following his death in 1087. The victor, William II Rufus, granted the city to a royal physician, John of Tours, who became Bishop of Wells and Abbot of Bath. Shortly after his consecration John bought Bath Abbey's grounds from the king, as well as the city of Bath itself. Whether John paid Rufus for the city or whether he was given it as a gift by the king is unclear. The abbey had recently lost its abbot, Ælfsige, and according to Domesday Book was the owner of large estates in and near the city; it was likely the abbey's wealth that attracted John to take over the monastery. By acquiring Bath, John also acquired the mint that was in the city.

In 1090 he transferred the seat, or administration, of the bishopric to Bath Abbey, probably in an attempt to increase the revenues of his see. Bath was a rich abbey, and Wells had always been a poor diocese. By taking over the abbey, John increased his episcopal revenues. William of Malmesbury portrays the moving of the episcopal seat as motivated by a desire for the lands of the abbey, but it was part of a pattern at the time of moving cathedral seats from small villages to larger towns. When John moved his episcopal seat, he also took over the abbey of Bath as his cathedral chapter, turning his diocese into a bishopric served by monks instead of the canons at Wells who had previously served the diocese. John rebuilt the monastic church at Bath, which had been damaged during one of Robert de Mowbray's rebellions. Permission was given to move the see of Somerset from Wells—a comparatively small settlement—to the then walled city of Bath.

When this was effected in 1090, John became the first Bishop of Bath, and St Peter's was raised to cathedral status. As the roles of bishop and abbot had been combined, the monastery became a priory, run by its prior. With the elevation of the abbey to cathedral status, it was felt that a larger, more up-to-date building was required. John of Tours planned a new cathedral on a grand scale, dedicated to Saint Peter and Saint Paul, but only the ambulatory was complete when he died in December 1122. He was buried in the cathedral. The most renowned scholar monk based in the abbey was Adelard of Bath; after his various travels he was back in the monastery by 1106.

The half-finished cathedral was devastated by fire in 1137, but work continued under Godfrey, the new bishop, until about 1156; the completed building was approximately 330 feet (101 m) long. It was consecrated while Robert of Bath was bishop. The specific date is not known; however, it was between 1148 and 1161.

In 1197, Reginald Fitz Jocelin's successor, Savaric FitzGeldewin, with the approval of Pope Celestine III, officially moved his seat to Glastonbury Abbey, but the monks there would not accept their new Bishop of Glastonbury and the title of Bishop of Bath and Glastonbury was used until the Glastonbury claim was abandoned in 1219. Savaric's successor, Jocelin of Wells, again moved the bishop's seat to Bath Abbey, with the title Bishop of Bath. Following his death the monks of Bath unsuccessfully attempted to regain authority over Wells. There were 40 monks on the roll in 1206.

Joint cathedral status was awarded by Pope Innocent IV to Bath and Wells in 1245. Roger of Salisbury was appointed the first Bishop of Bath and Wells, having been Bishop of Bath for a year previously. Later bishops preferred Wells, the canons of which had successfully petitioned various popes down the years for Wells to regain cathedral status. The great Romanesque cathedral church, begun in the early twelfth century, was allowed to fall into chronic disrepair during the fifteenth century. In 1485 the priory had 22 monks. When Oliver King, Bishop of Bath and Wells (1495–1503), visited Bath in 1499 he was shocked to find this famous church "ruined to its foundations". He also described lax discipline, idleness and a group of monks "all too eager to succumb to the temptations of the flesh".

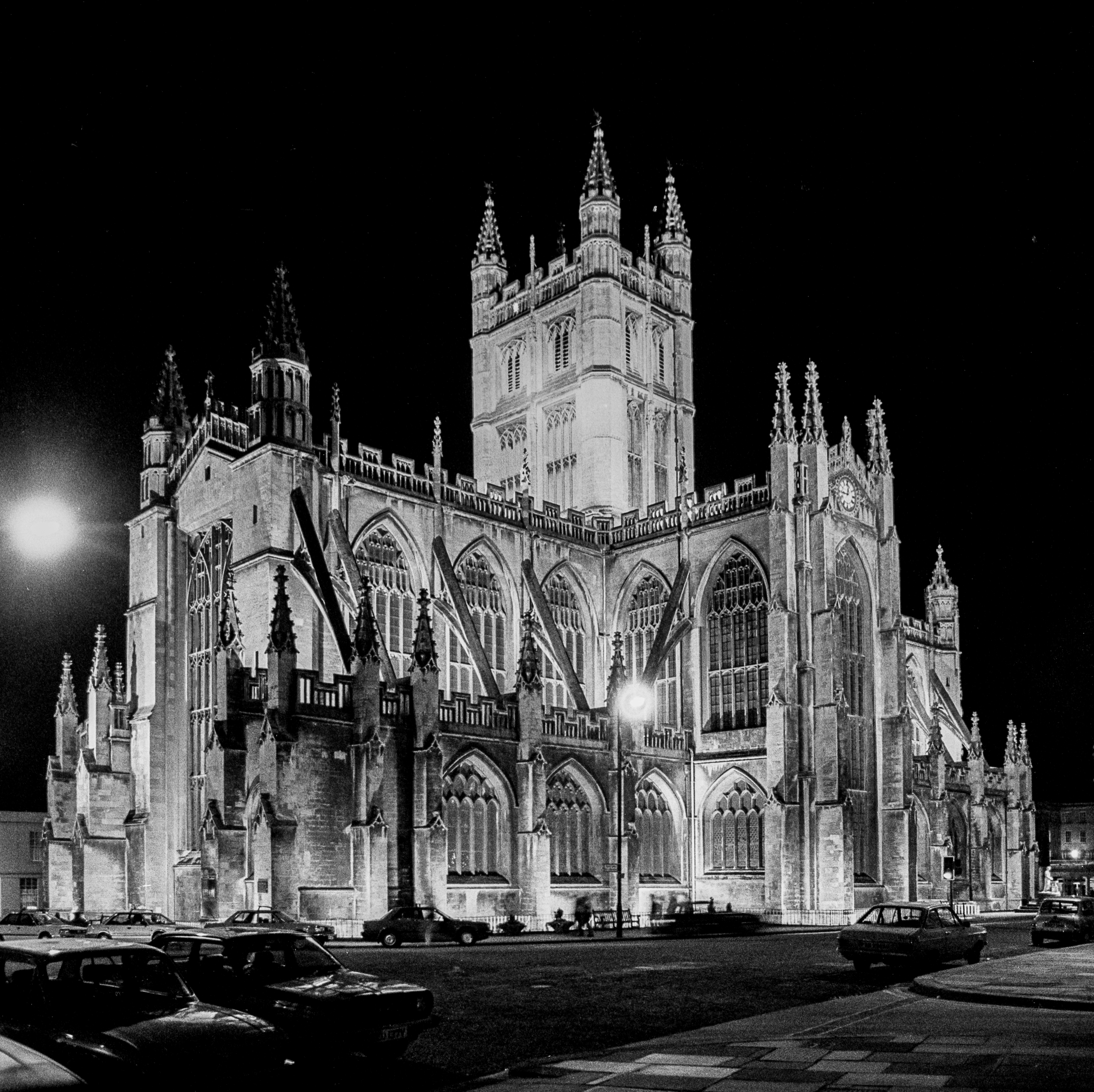
A black and white photograph of Bath Abbey, taken at night, from a north-westerly direction

King took a year to consider what action to take, before writing to the Prior of Bath in October 1500 to explain that a large amount of the priory income would be dedicated to rebuilding the cathedral. There are several stories that, on a visit to Bath, King had a dream in which he "saw the Heavenly Host on high with angels ascending and descending by ladder" which is now represented on the west front of the cathedral. However, this interpretation, which first appeared in the writings of John Harington, around 100 years after it was supposed to have happened, has been challenged.

Robert and William Vertue, the king's masons were commissioned, promising to build the finest vault in England, promising "there shall be none so goodely neither in England nor France". Their design incorporated the surviving Norman crossing wall and arches. They appointed Thomas Lynne to supervise work on site and work probably began the following spring. Oliver King planned a smaller church, covering the area of the Norman nave only. He did not live to see the result, but the restoration of the cathedral was completed just a few years before the Dissolution of the Monasteries in 1539.

=== Reformation and subsequent decline ===
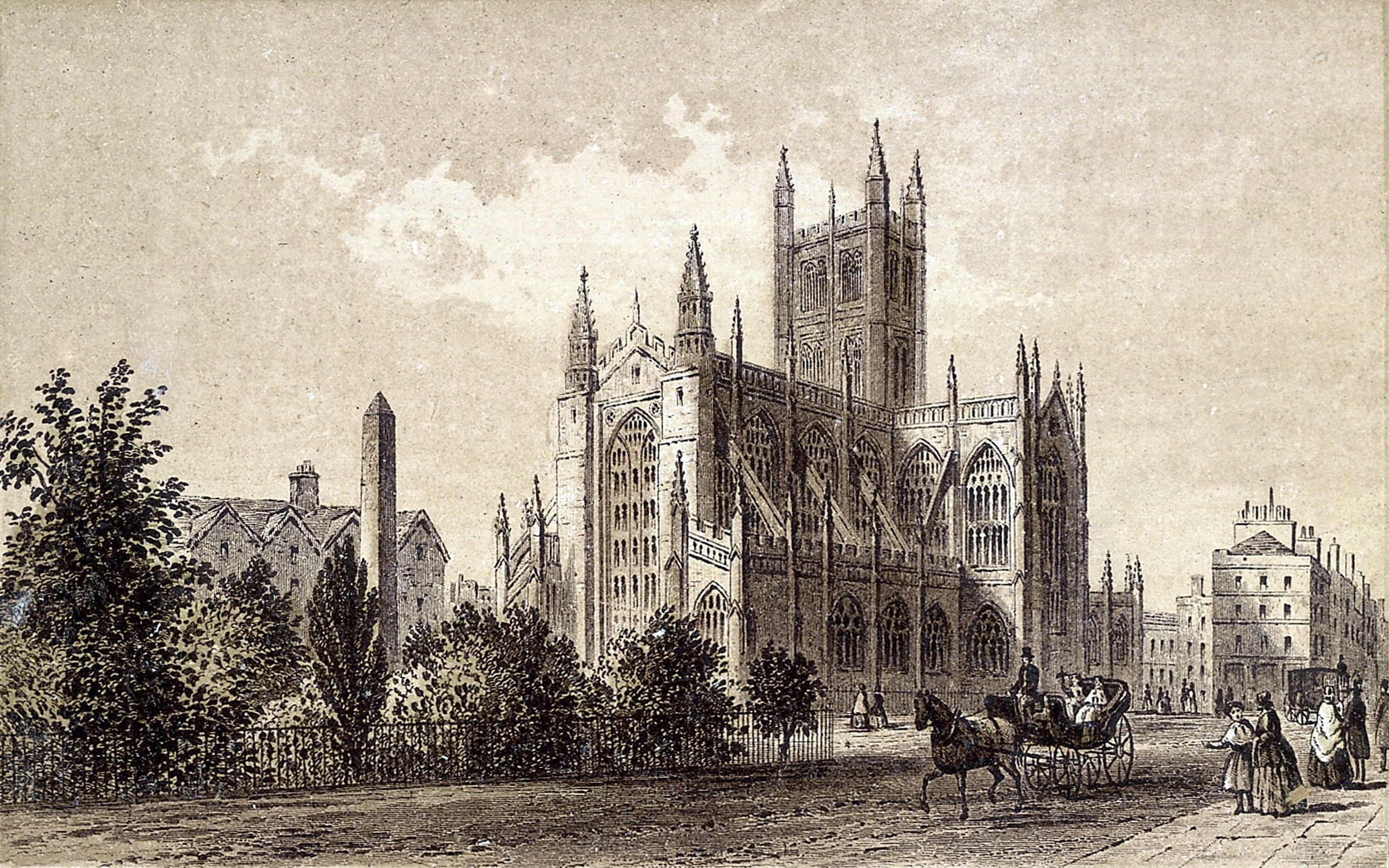
The abbey in 1875

Prior Holloway surrendered Bath Priory to the crown in January 1539. It was sold to Humphry Colles of Taunton. The abbey was stripped of its co-cathedral status in the aftermath of the Dissolution when the cathedral was consolidated in Wells. The church was stripped of iron, glass and £4,800 worth of lead and left to decay. Colles sold it to Matthew Colthurst of Wardour Castle in 1543. His son Edmund Colthurst gave the roofless remains of the building to the corporation of Bath in 1572. The corporation had difficulty finding private funds for its restoration.

In 1574, Queen Elizabeth I promoted the restoration of the church, to serve as the grand parish church of Bath. She ordered that a national fund should be set up to finance the work, and in 1583 decreed that it should become the parish church of Bath. James Montague, the Bishop of Bath and Wells from 1608 to 1616, paid £1,000 for a new nave roof of timber lath construction; according to the inscription on his tomb, this was prompted after seeking shelter in the roofless nave during a thunderstorm. He is buried in an alabaster tomb in the north aisle. The restoration work on the Abbey financed by Montague was completed by 1611.

=== Modern renaissance ===
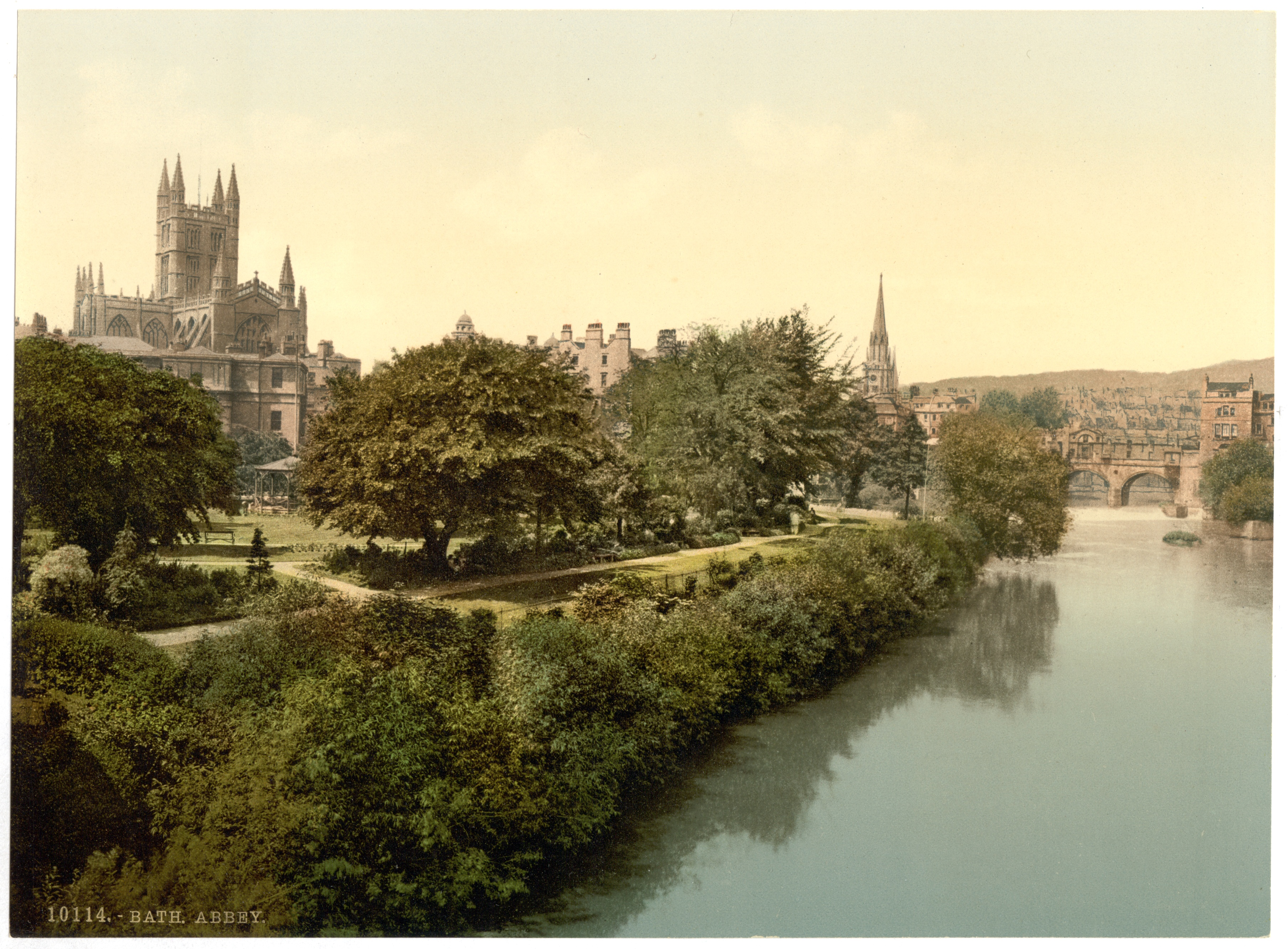
Bath Abbey c. 1900

During the 1820s and 1830s buildings, including houses, shops and taverns which were very close to or actually touching the walls of the abbey were demolished and the interior remodelled by George Phillips Manners who was the Bath City Architect. Manners erected flying buttresses to the exterior of the nave and added pinnacles to the turrets.

Major restoration work was carried out by Sir George Gilbert Scott in the 1860s, funded by the rector, Charles Kemble. The work included the installation of fan vaulting in the nave, which was not merely a fanciful aesthetic addition but a completion of the original design. Oliver King had arranged for the vaulting of the choir, to a design by William and Robert Vertue. There are clues in the stonework that King intended the vaulting to continue into the nave, but that this plan was abandoned, probably for reasons of cost. In addition a stone screen between the choir and nave was removed. Scott's work was completed by his pupil Thomas Graham Jackson in the 1890s including work on the west front. Gilbert-Scott also designed the finely carved pews in the nave, which are among the finest examples of Church seating from the period, and have been described as "one of the most magnificent and extensive suites of Victorian church seating in the country".

Work carried out in the 20th and 21st centuries included full cleaning of the stonework and the reconstruction of the pipe organ by Klais Orgelbau of Bonn. The west front of the building, having decayed badly in the 500 years since it was built, has been subject to almost wholesale restoration. The stonework of the west front had been subject to natural erosion therefore a process of lime-based conservation was carried out during the 1990s by Nimbus Conservation under the guidance of Professor Robert Baker who had previously worked on the west front of Wells Cathedral. Some of the damage to sculptures had been made worse by the use of Portland cement by previous work carried out in the Victorian era. A statue of St Phillip was beyond repair and was removed and replaced with a modern statue by Laurence Tindall.

=== Rectors of Bath Abbey ===
- 1583–1584 John Long
- 1584–1608 Richard Meredith (as Dean of Wells from 1607)
- 1608–1621† John Pelling
- 1621–1634 George Webb (appointed Bishop of Limerick)
- 1634–1639 Theophilus Webb (son of George Webb)
- 1639–1665† James Masters (sequestered by the Westminster Assembly; restored; Sub-Dean of Wells from 1661)
- 1666–1680† Joseph Glanvill
- 1681–1711† William Clement (as Archdeacon of Bath from 1690)
- 1711–1733† William Hunt (as Archdeacon of Bath)
- 1733–1752† Thomas Coney
- 1752–1767† Duel Taylor
- 1767–1768† John Taylor
- 1768–1786† John Chapman (as Archdeacon of Bath)
- 1786–1815† James Phillott (as Archdeacon of Bath from 1798)
- 1815–1837† Charles Crook
- 1839–1854 William Brodrick (later Viscount Midleton and Dean of Exeter)
- 1854–1859† Thomas Carr (formerly Bishop of Bombay)
- 1859–1874† Charles Kemble
- 1875–1895 Richard England Brooke (grandfather of Rupert Brooke)
- 1895–1901 John Quirk (appointed Bishop of Sheffield)
- 1902–1938 Sydney Boyd (as Archdeacon of Bath from 1924)
- 1938–1947 William Selwyn (as Archdeacon of Bath; appointed Bishop of Fulham)
- 1947–1960 Edwin Cook (as Archdeacon of Bath)
- 1960–1989 Geoffrey Lester
- 1990–2000 Richard Askew
- 2001–2003 Simon Oberst (resigned, disqualified from priesthood)
- 2004–2017 Edward Mason
- 2019–2025 Guy Bridgewater
- 2025–Present Chantal Mason (Acting Rector)

† Rector died in post

== Architecture ==
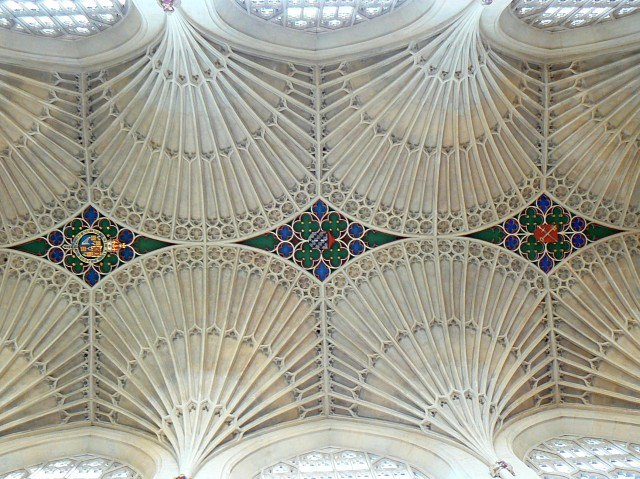
Bath Abbey, vaults

The Abbey is built of Bath stone, which gives the exterior its yellow colour, and is not a typical example of the Perpendicular form of Gothic architecture; the low aisles and nave arcades and the very tall clerestory present the opposite balance to that which was usual in perpendicular churches. As this building was to serve as a monastic church, it was built to a cruciform plan, which had become relatively rare in parish churches of the time. The interior contains fine fan vaulting by Robert and William Vertue, who designed similar vaulting for the Henry VII chapel, at Westminster Abbey. The building has 52 windows, occupying about 80% of the wall space, giving the interior an impression of lightness, and reflecting the different attitudes towards churchmanship shown by the clergy of the time and those of the 12th century.

The walls and roofs are supported by buttresses and surmounted by battlements, pinnacles and pierced parapets, many of which were added by George Manners during his 1830s restorations.

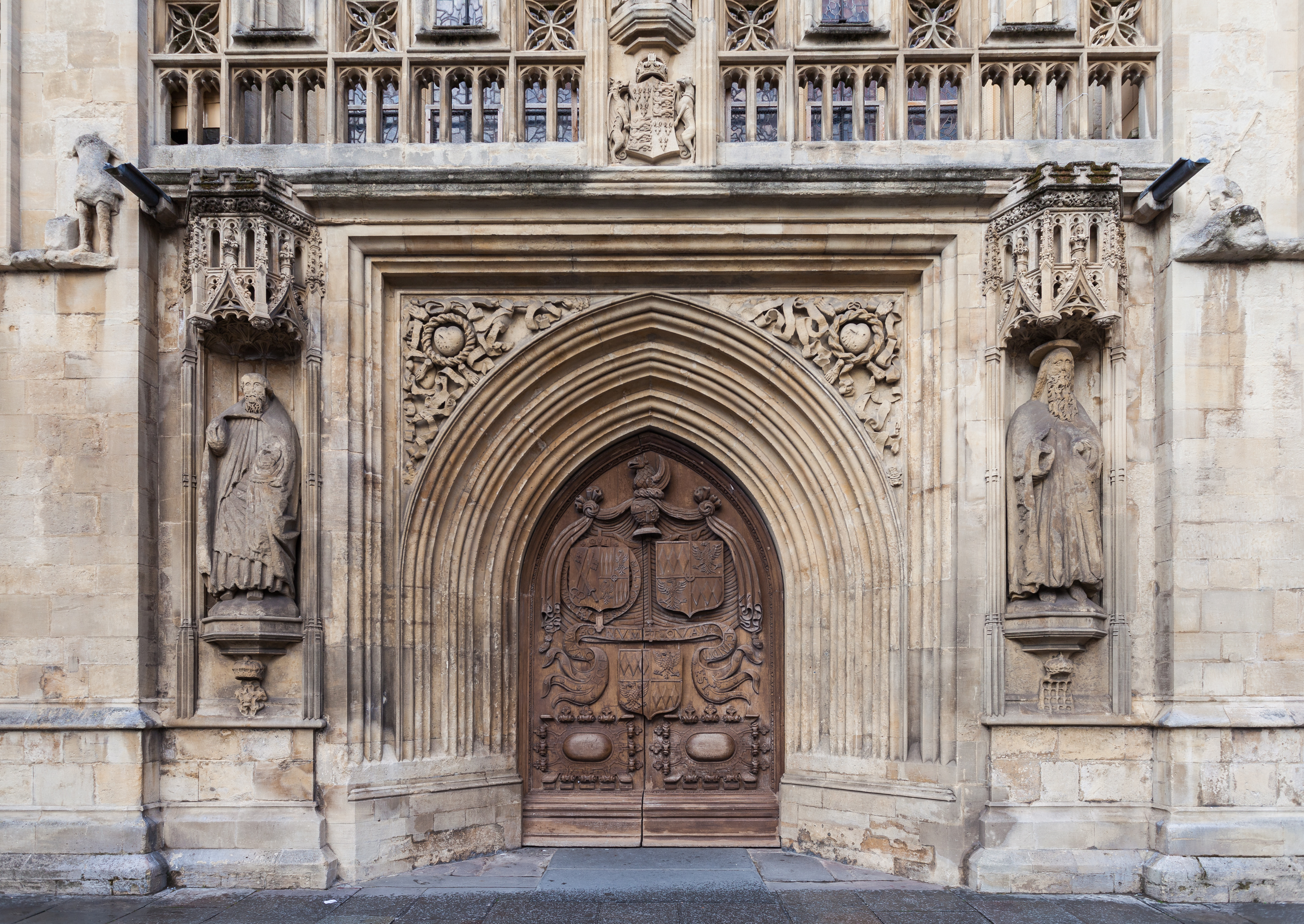
The 16th-century West Door

The nave, which has five bays, is 211 feet (64 m) long and 35 feet (11 m) wide to the pillars and rises to 75 feet (23 m), with the whole church being 225 feet (69 m) long and 80 feet (24 m) wide.

The west front, which was originally constructed in 1520, has a large arched window and detailed carvings. Above the window are carvings of angels and to either side long stone ladders with angels climbing up them. Apart from the story mentioned above connecting it with Oliver King, Bishop of Bath and Wells (1495–1503), this is a direct reference to the dream of the patriarch Jacob mentioned in the Bible (Genesis 28:12) and commonly called Jacob's Ladder.

Below the window a battlemented parapet supports a statue and beneath this, on either side of the door, are statues of St Peter and St Paul. Restoration work in the late 20th century involved cleaning with electronically controlled intermittent water sprays and ammonium carbonate poultices. One of the figures which had lost its head and shoulders was replaced. The sculptures on the West front have been interpreted as representing "spiritual ascent through the virtue of humility and descent through the vice of pride" and Christ as the Man of Sorrow and the Antichrist. During the 1990s a major restoration and cleaning work were carried out on the exterior stonework, returning it to the yellow colour hidden under centuries of dirt.

=== Windows ===
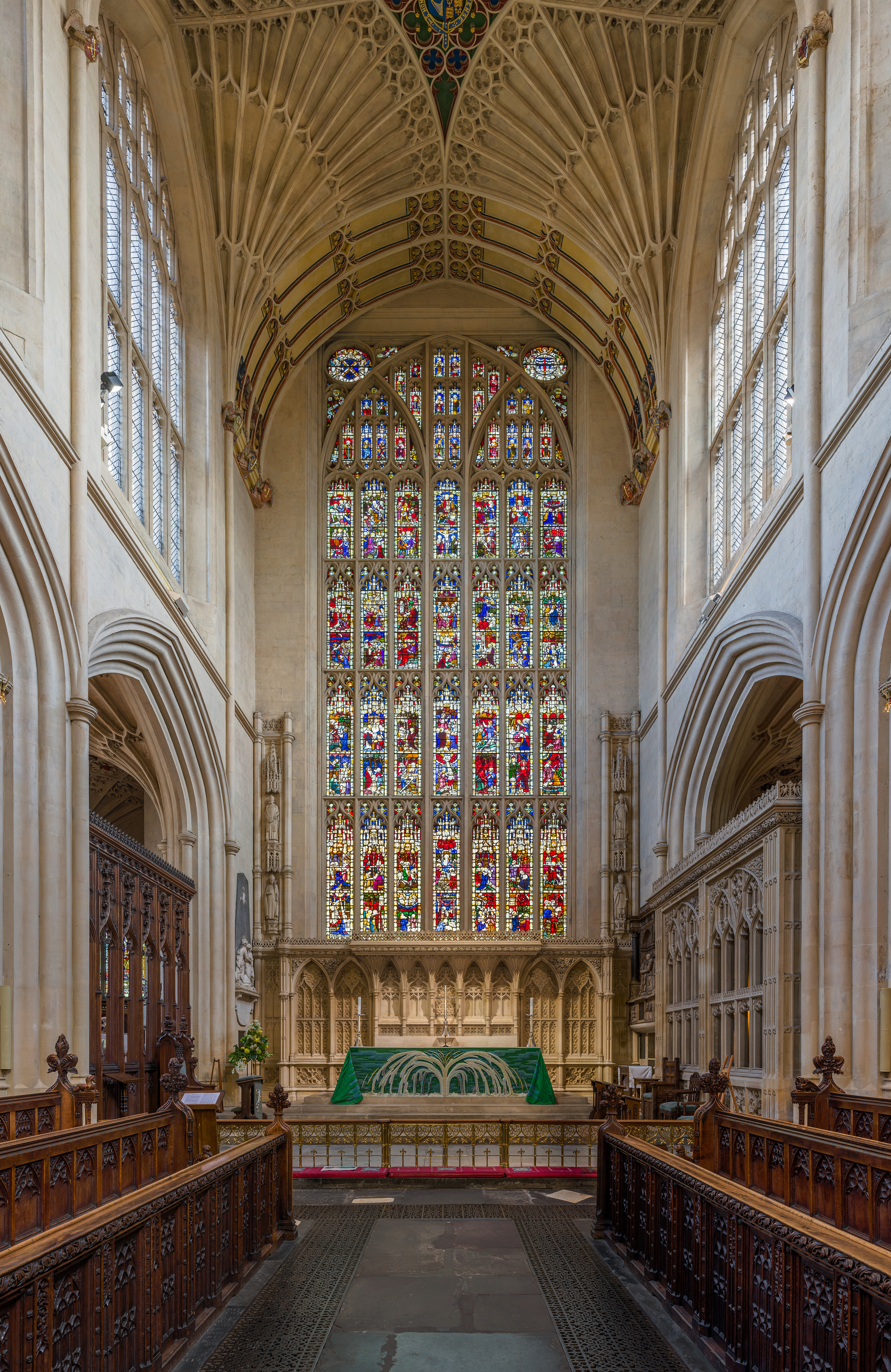
The stained glass and altar at the eastern end of the nave

The building has 52 windows, occupying about 80 per cent of the wall space. The east end has a square-framed window of seven lights. It includes a depiction of the nativity made by Clayton and Bell in 1872, and was presented to the church by the Bath Literary Club.

The window of the Four Evangelists over the northwest door is a memorial to Charles Empson, who died in 1861.

In 2010 a stained glass window was uncovered in the abbey vaults. The design around the window is by William Burges.

=== Tower ===
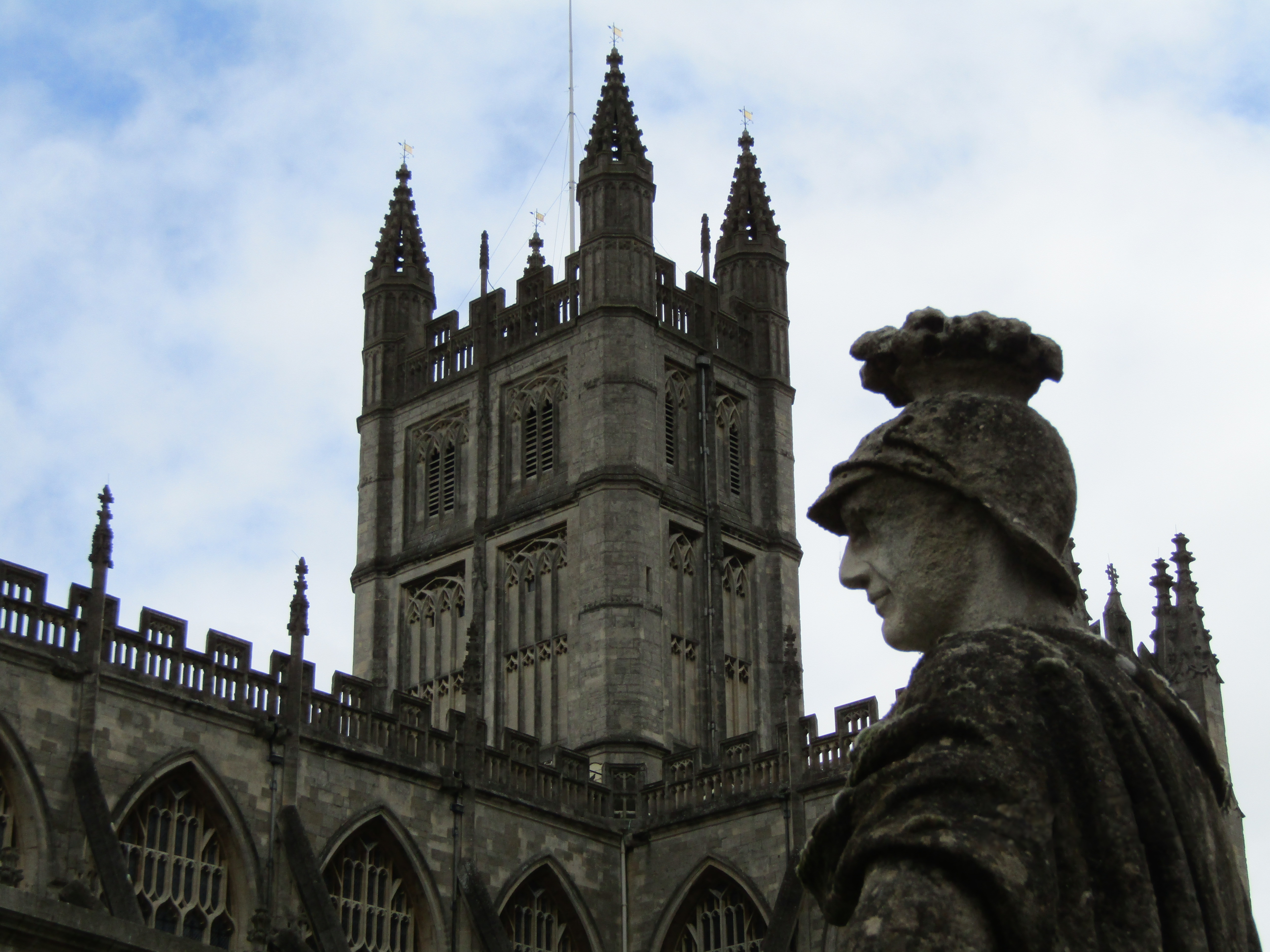
Tower as seen from Roman Baths

The two-stage central tower is not square but oblong in plan. It has two bell openings on each side and four polygonal turret pinnacles. The tower is 161 feet (49 m) high, and is accessed by a staircase of 212 steps.

==== Bells ====
In 1700 the old ring of six bells was replaced by a new ring of eight. All but the tenor still survive. In 1770 two lighter bells were added to create the first ring of ten bells in the diocese. The tenor was recast in 1870. The abbey's tower is now home to a ring of ten bells, which are hung unconventionally such that the order of the bells from highest to lowest runs anti-clockwise around the ringing chamber, rather than in the usual clockwise fashion. The tenor weighs 33 cwt (3,721 lb or 1,688 kg). Bath is a noted centre of change ringing in the West Country.

=== Interior ===
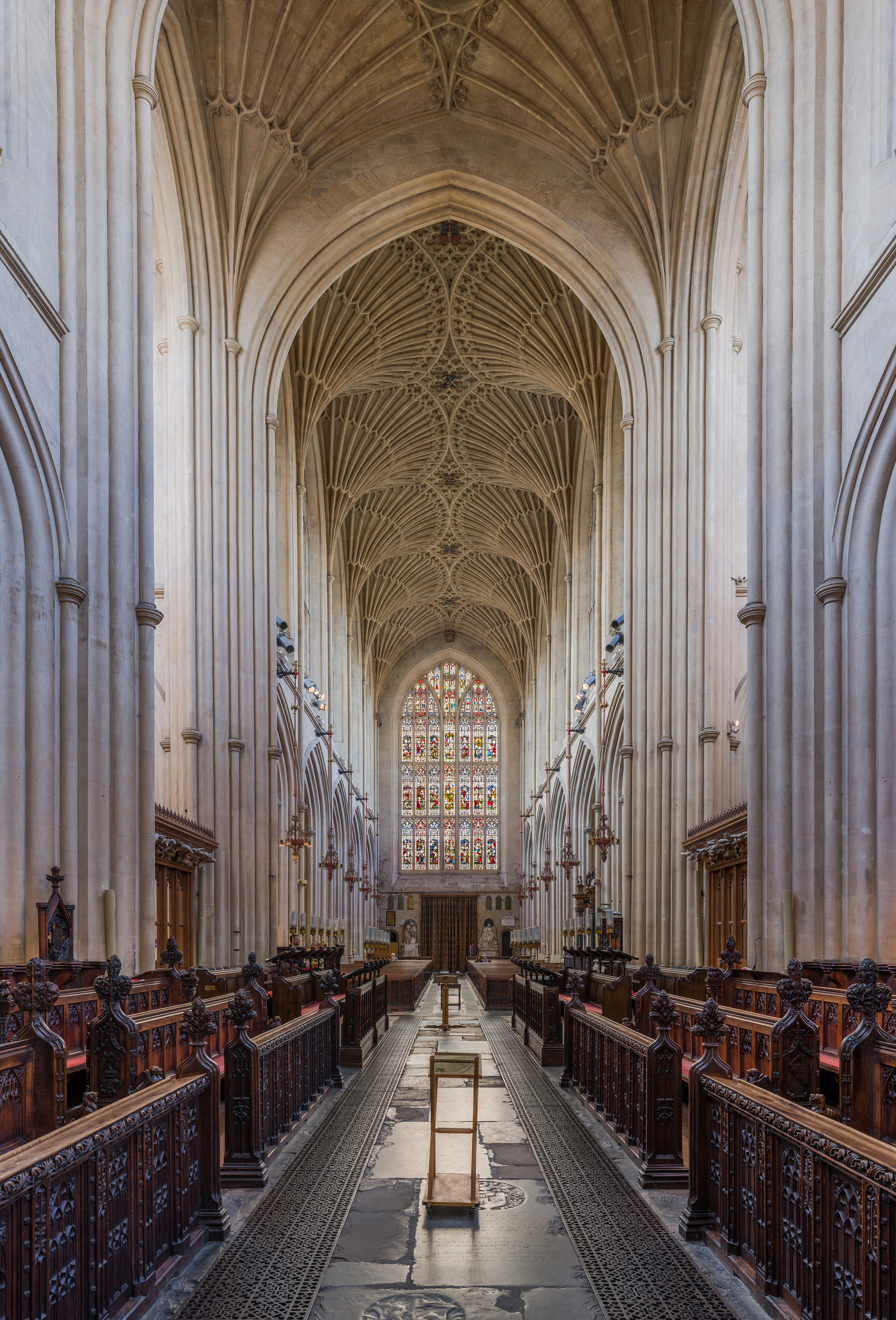
Looking west from the choir, the fan vaulting is mostly 19th-century

The interior fan vaulting ceiling, originally installed by Robert and William Vertue, was restored by Sir George Gilbert Scott between 1864 and 1874. The fan vaulting provides structural stability by distributing the weight of the roof down ribs that transfer the force into the supporting columns via the flying buttresses.

Gilbert Scott's work in the 1870s included the installation of large gas chandeliers made by the Coventry metalworker Francis Skidmore. They were converted to electricity in 1979. Other new features included a new pulpit and seating. A marble altarpiece from General George Wade in the sanctuary was removed and replaced with a decorative reredos. The fine carved pews installed in the nave during Scott's renovations, one of the best examples of 19th century church furnishings, were removed and replaced with stackable chairs in 2018, a move which was opposed by the Victorian Society leading to a Consistory court case which was decided in favour of the Abbey.

In the 1920s Thomas Graham Jackson redesigned the Norman Chapel into a War Memorial Chapel, now Gethsemane Chapel, and added a cloister. New quire screens were installed in 2004, partly to improve the acoustics, topped with 12 carved angels playing musical instruments.

A tiled floor dating from the late 13th to early 14th centuries was discovered in August 2018. Work to rebury coffins which had previously been under the abbey and stabilise the floor included the digging of a trench in which the tiles were uncovered.

==== Monuments ====
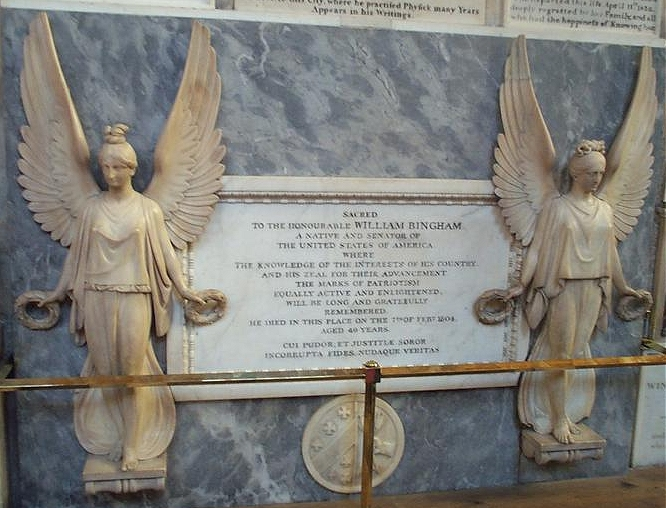
Memorial to Senator William Bingham, who died in Bath

Within the abbey are 617 wall memorials and 847 floor stones. They include those dedicated to Beau Nash, Admiral Arthur Phillip (first Governor of the colony of New South Wales, which became part of Australia after federation in 1901), James Montague (Bishop of Bath and Wells), Lady Waller (wife of William Waller, a Roundhead military leader in the English Civil War), Elizabeth Grieve (wife of James Grieve, physician to Elizabeth, Empress of Russia), Sir William Baker, John Sibthorp, Richard Hussey Bickerton, William Hoare, Richard Bickerton and US Senator William Bingham. Many of the monuments in the churchyard were carved between 1770 and 1860 by Reeves of Bath. War memorials include those commemorating the First Anglo-Afghan War (1841–42), the First World War (1914–18), and the Second World War (1939–45). The most recent memorial was installed in 1958 to commemorate Isaac Pitman, the developer of Pitman shorthand, who died in 1897.

==== Main organ ====
The first mention of an organ in the abbey dates to 1634, but nothing is known of that instrument. The first properly recorded organ in Bath Abbey was built by Abraham Jordan in 1708. It was modified in 1718 and 1739 by Jordan's son. The specification recorded in 1800 was one of twenty stops spread over three manuals. The compasses of the manuals were extended, one and a half octaves of pedals were added and the instrument renovated in 1802 by John Holland; further repairs were effected by Flight & Robson in 1826. This instrument was removed first to the Bishop's Palace at Wells in 1836, then to St Mary's Church, Yatton, where it was subsequently rebuilt and extensively modified.

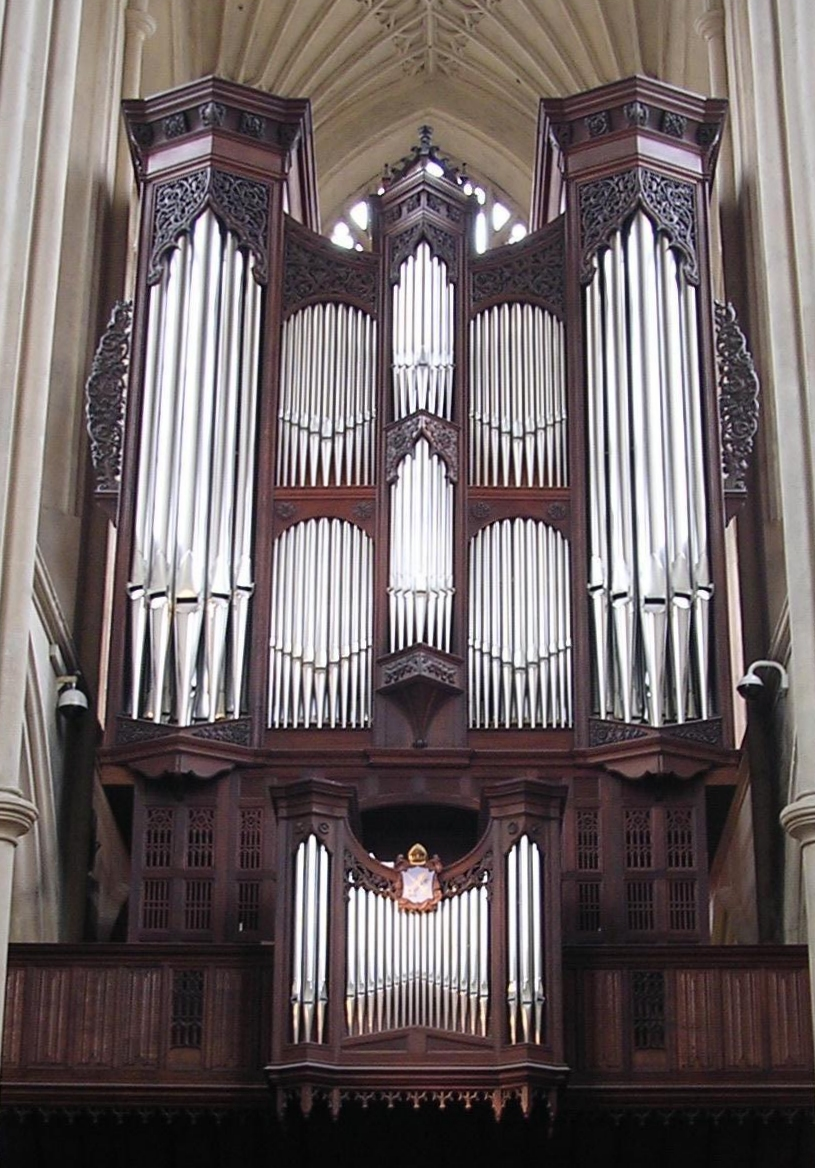
The organ in the north transept, rebuilt in 1997 by Klais Orgelbau

The abbey's next organ was built in 1836 by John Smith of Bristol, to a specification of thirty stops over three manuals and pedals. This instrument was rebuilt on a new gallery in the North Transept by William Hill & Son of London in 1868, to a specification of forty stops spread over four manuals and pedals, although the Solo department, which would have brought the total to well over forty, was not completed. It was mostly removed to the Church of St Peter & St Paul, Cromer in 1896, the remainder being kept for incorporation in the new abbey organ.

A new organ was supplied to the abbey in 1895 by Norman and Beard of Norwich. It had 52 stops spread over four manuals and pedals, and stood divided on two steel beams in the North and South crossing arches, with the console standing on the floor next to the north-west pier of the crossing. New cases were to be provided to designs by Brian Oliver of Bath, but were never executed. Norman & Beard re-erected it in a new case designed by Sir Thomas Jackson in the North Transept in 1914, with the addition of two stops to the Pedal. It was again rebuilt by them in 1930, and then by Hill, Norman and Beard in 1948, which brought the number of stops to 58. In 1972 this was increased to a total of 65 speaking stops. The Positive division, with its separate case behind the console, was installed at the same time. Problems caused by the tonal scheme's lack of coherence—the 1895 pipework contrasting sharply with that of 1972—and with reliability, caused by the wide variety of different types of key actions, all difficult to access, led to the decision to have the instrument rebuilt yet again.

The organ was totally reconstructed in 1997 by Klais Orgelbau of Bonn, retaining the existing instrument as far as was possible and restoring it largely to its 1895 condition, although the Positive division was kept. The instrument as it now stands has 63 speaking stops over four manuals and pedals, and is built largely on the Werkprinzip principle of organ layout: the case is only one department deep, except for parts of the Pedal sited at the back rather than the sides of the case. New 75 per cent tin front pipes were made and the case completed with back, side walls and roof. Pierced panelling executed by Derek Riley of Lyndale Woodcarving in Saxmundham, Suffolk, was provided to allow sound egress from the bottom of the case. The old console has been retained but thoroughly rebuilt with modern accessories and all-new manuals. Twenty-two of the organ's 83 ranks contain some pipework from the 1868 instrument. Four ranks are made up entirely of 1868 pipework, and 21 contain 1895 pipework. Only two ranks are entirely of 1895. Forty-eight ranks contain some new pipework, 34 of which are entirely new. Old wind pressures have been used wherever possible. The old wind reservoirs have also been restored rather than replaced. The instrument has tracker key action on the manuals, with electrically assisted tracker action to the pedals. The stop action is electric throughout.

==== Continuo organ ====
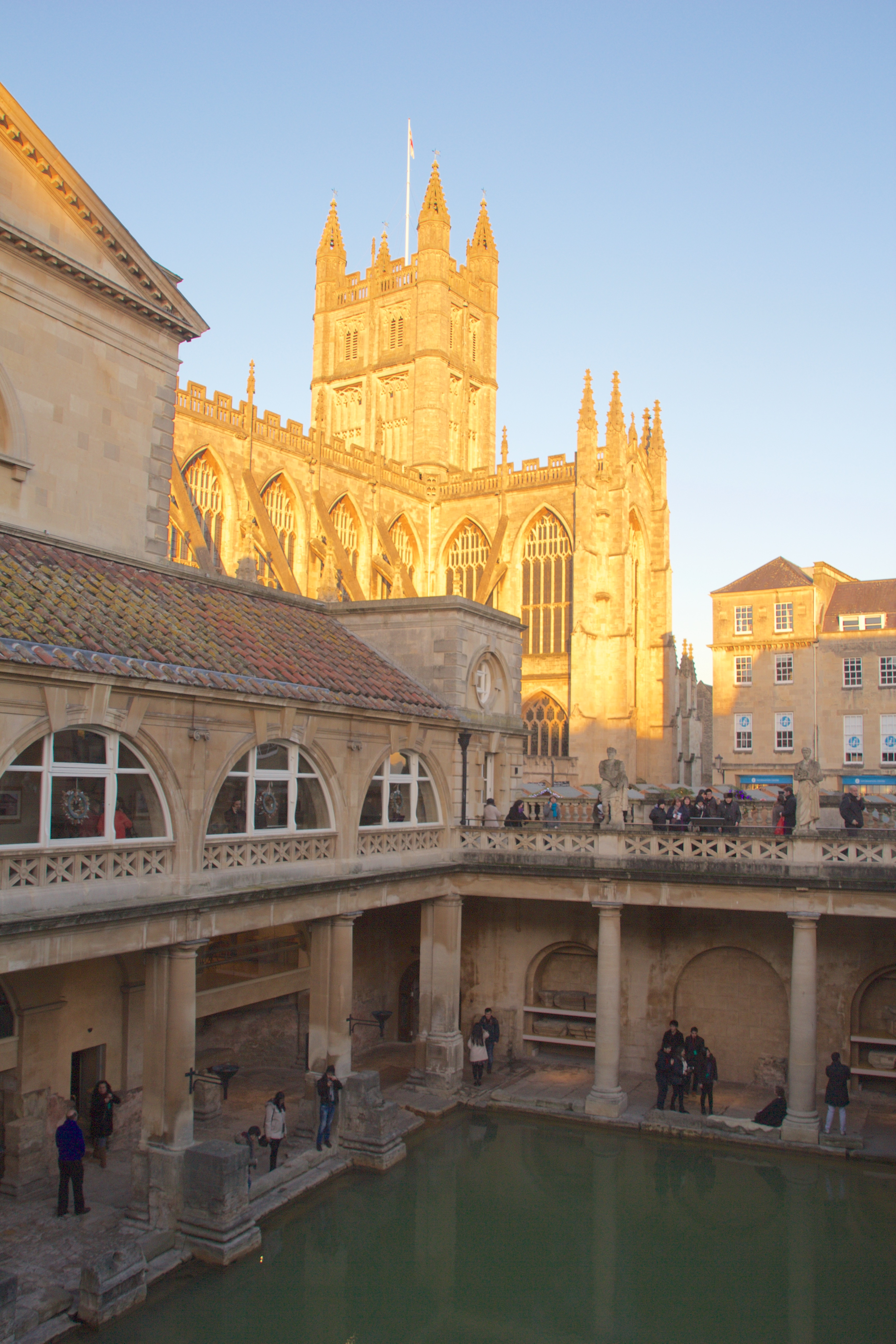
Bath Abbey and the Roman baths

A four-stop continuo organ was built for the abbey in 1999 by Northampton-based organ builder Kenneth Tickell. The instrument, contained in a case of dark oak, is portable, and can be tuned to three pitches: A=440 Hz (modern concert pitch), A=415 Hz and A=465 Hz. It is also possible to tune at A=430. A lever pedal can reduce the stops sounding to only the 8' stop and, when released, returns the organ to the registration in use before it was depressed.

== Choir ==
The abbey has sections for boys, girls, lay clerks and children (the Melody Makers) and a chamber choir. As well as singing at the abbey, they also tour to cathedrals in the UK and Europe. The choir has broadcast Choral Evensong on BBC Radio 3, and has made several recordings. It performed at the Three Tenors concert for the opening of the Thermae Bath Spa. The abbey is also used as a venue for visiting choirs and, from its inception in 1947, the City of Bath Bach Choir.

The choirs of Bath Abbey sung the 2015 Christmas Service live on BBC One.

They are led by the directors of music and assisted by the organists. The current Director of Music is Huw Williams who took the role in 2017. He replaced Peter King who served from 1986 to 2016.

== Discovery Centre museum ==
Bath Abbey's Discovery Centre is located beneath the Abbey shop and features artefacts and exhibits about the Abbey's development and history. Displays included the history of the building of the Abbey, monastic life, and the Abbey's impact on the community, the architecture and sculptures of the buildings, and the role of the Abbey in present times. The Discovery Centre replaces the previous Heritage Museum.

== Gallery ==
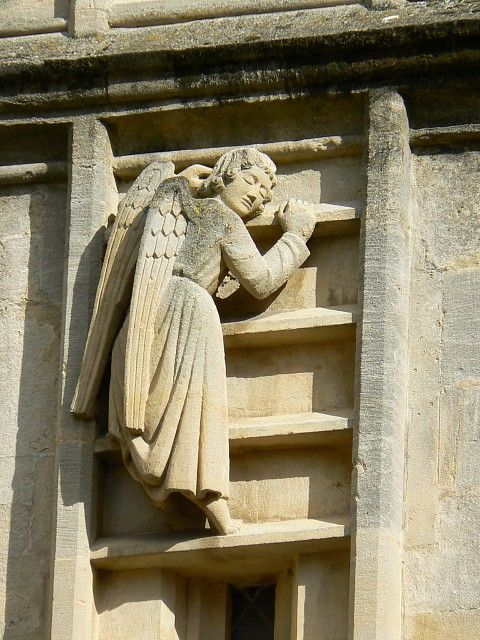
An angel on the way up, Bath Abbey west elevation

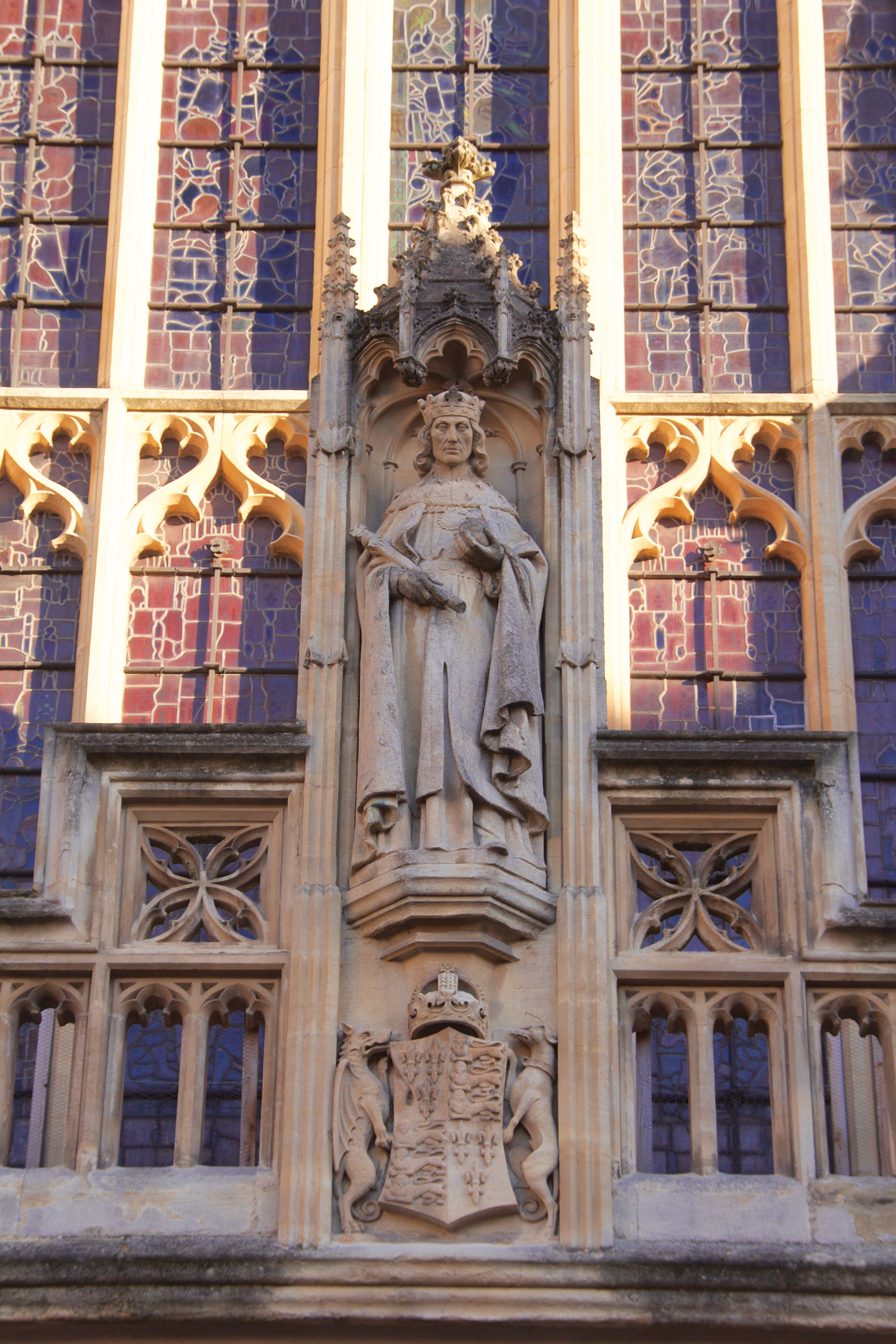

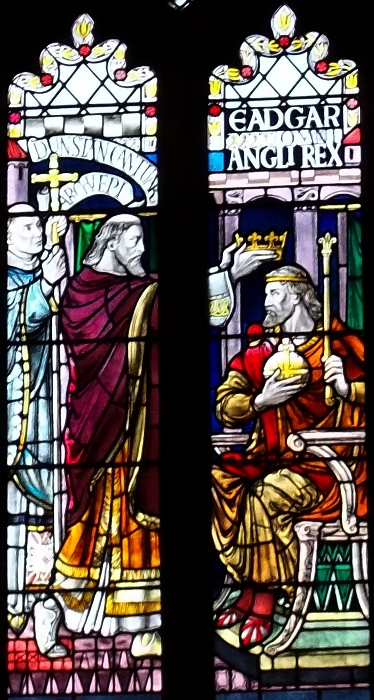
19th-century stained glass window showing the coronation of King Edgar by Dunstan

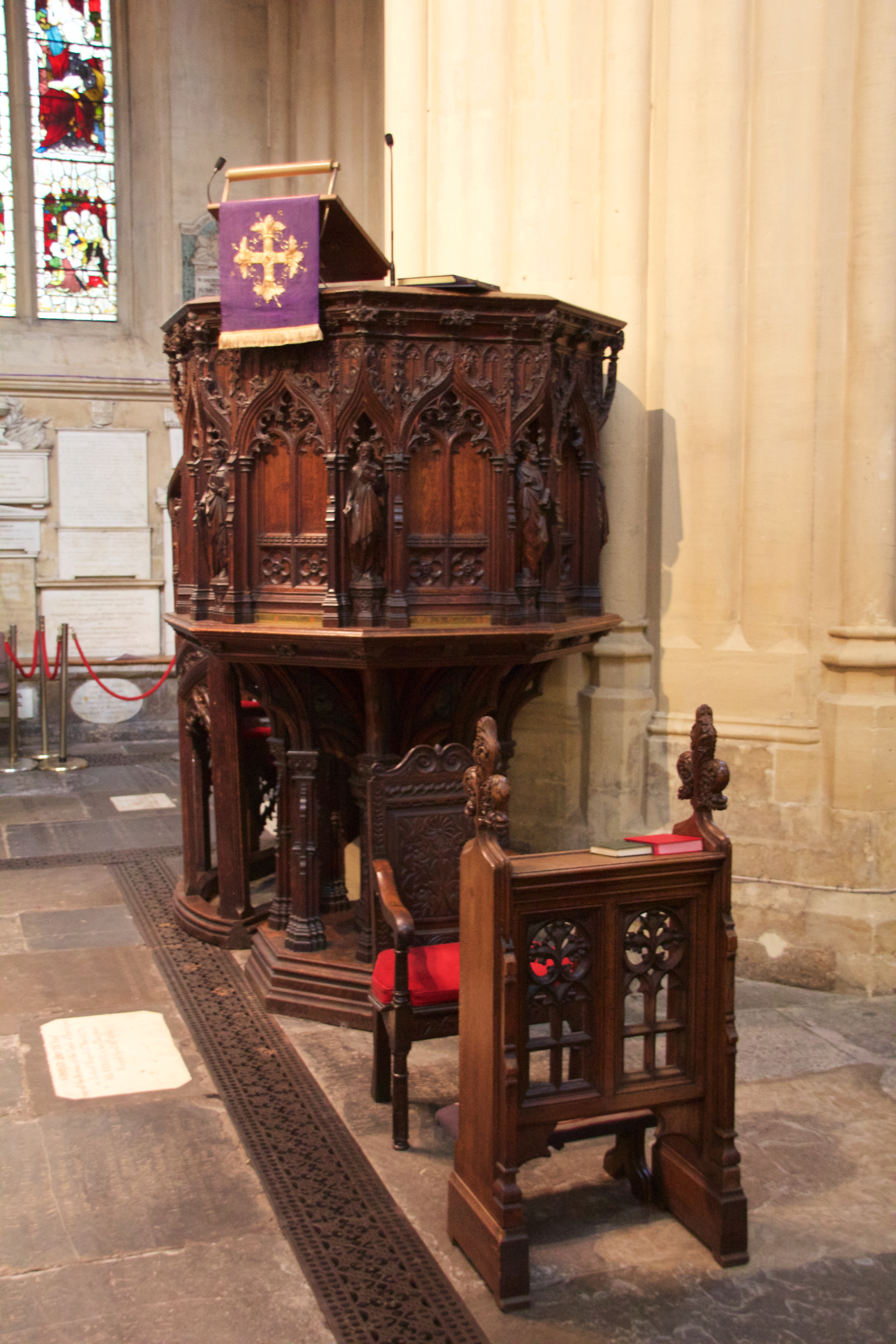
Bath Abbey

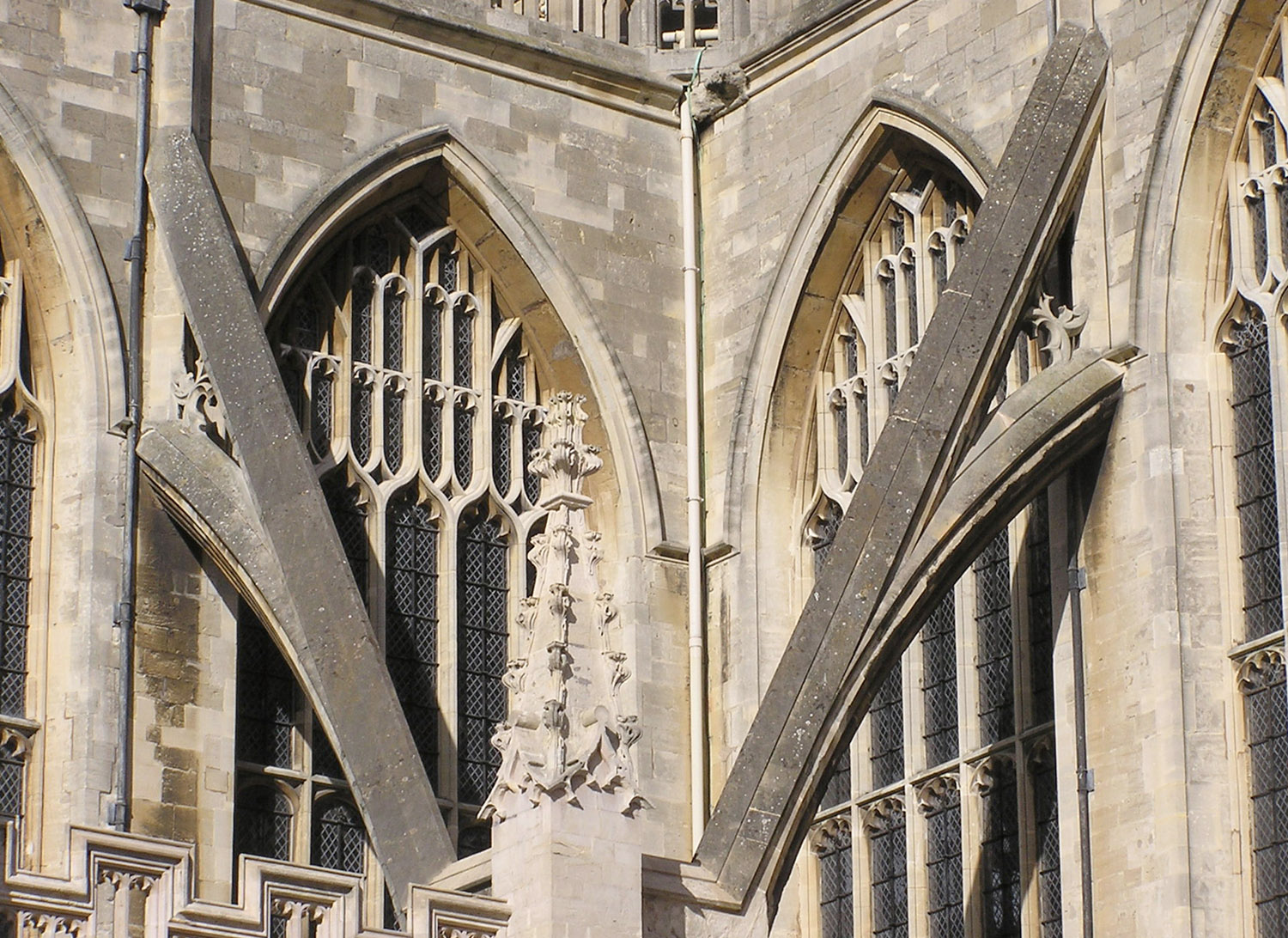
Flying buttresses and a pinnacle at the abbey

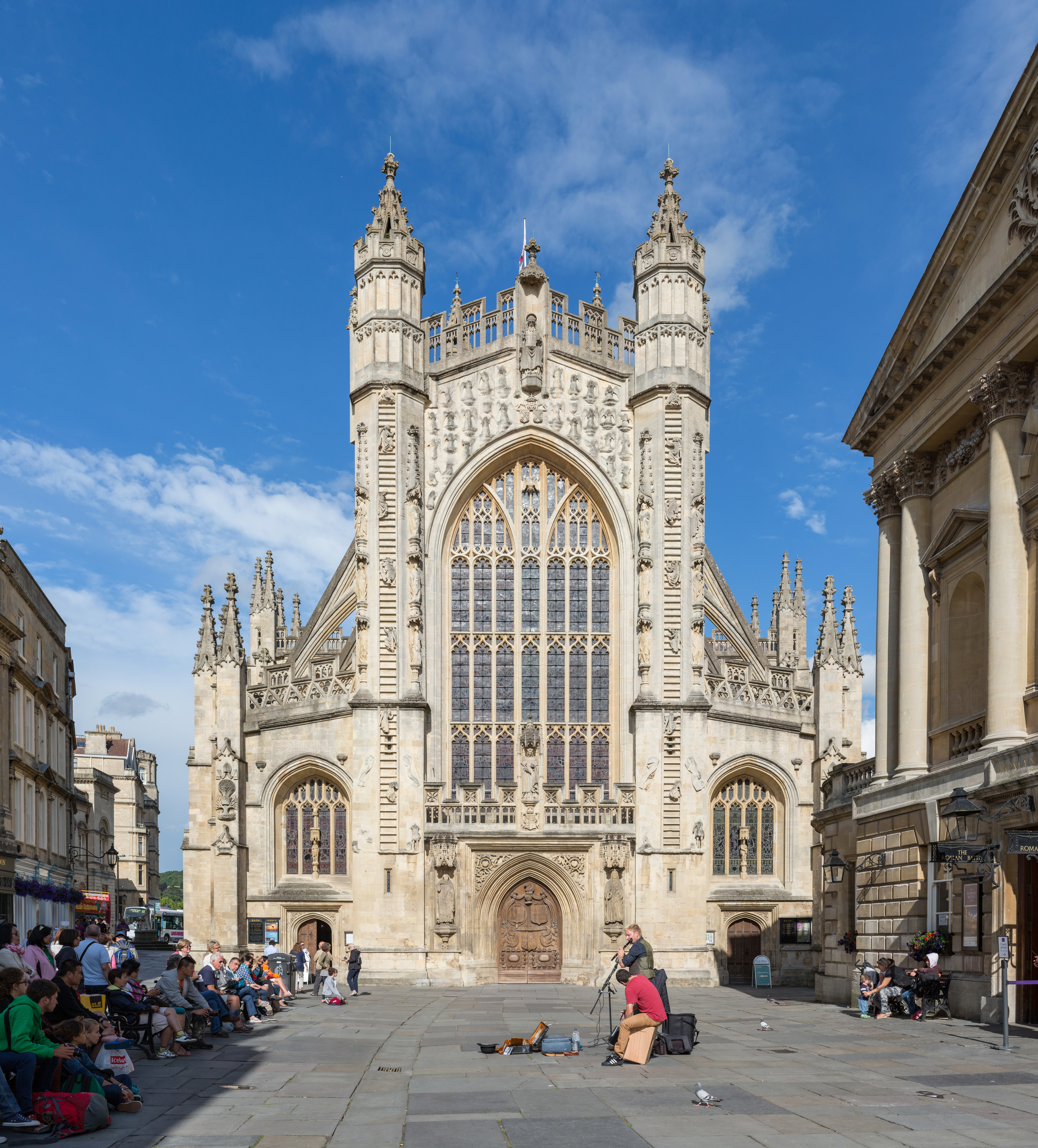
Bath Abbey exterior as viewed from the west

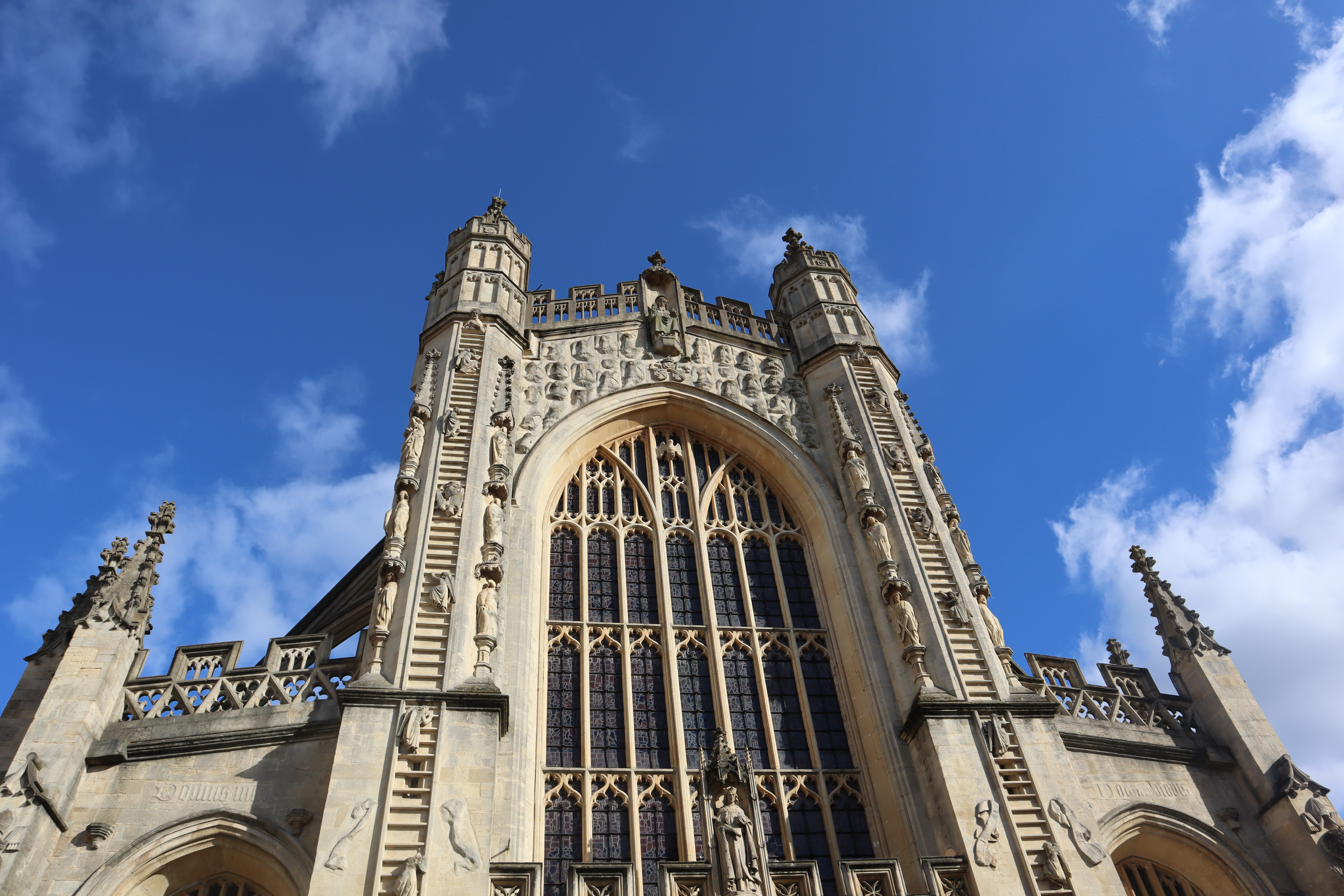
Close up Bath Abbey Building

== Burials ==
- James Montague, bishop (c. 1568–1618)
- Wolfran Cornewall, Royal Navy captain (1658–1720)
- Sir Henry Johnson, 1st Baronet, general (1748–1835)
- William Bingham, American senator (1752–1804)
- William Wyatt Dimond, actor-manager (c. 1752–1812)
- John Sibthorp, botanist (1758–1796)
- Thomas Robert Malthus, political economist who inspired Charles Darwin (1766–1834)
- Sir Everard Fawkener, English merchant, diplomat and personal secretary to the Duke of Cumberland (1694–1758)
- Edward Cranfield, Royal Governor of New Hampshire (c.1649–1700)

== See also ==
- List of former cathedrals in Great Britain
- List of organists and assistant organists of Bath Abbey
- List of English abbeys, priories and friaries serving as parish churches
- List of ecclesiastical parishes in the Diocese of Bath and Wells

== Bibliography ==
- Astley, Gus (1993). "Bath Abbey: West Front". Conservation News. 51: 13–14.
- Barlow, Frank (March 2000). William Rufus. Yale University Press. ISBN 978-0-300-08291-3.
- Brakspear, Harold (1913). Bath Abbey. British Publishing Company.
- Britton, John (1825). The history and antiquities of Bath Abbey Church. Longman. "bath abbey."
- Brooke, C. N. L. (1976). Church and Government in the Middle Ages. Cambridge University Press. ISBN 978-0-521-21172-7.
- Davenport, Peter (2002). Medieval Bath Uncovered. Tempus. ISBN 0-7524-1965-X.
- Dumville, David (1992). Wessex and England from Alfred to Edgar. Woodbridge, Suffolk: The Boydell Press. ISBN 978-0-85115-308-7.
- Dunning, Robert (2001). Somerset Monasteries. Tempus. ISBN 978-0-7524-1941-1.
- Falconer, David (1972). Notes on the Organs of Bath Abbey. R. Allen Press.
- Falconer, David (1999). Bath Abbey. Sutton Publishing. ISBN 978-0750923118.
- Forsyth, Michael (2003). Pevsner Architectural Guides: Bath. Yale University Press. ISBN 978-0300101775.
- Fryde, E.B. (1986). Handbook of British Chronology. Royal Hist.Soc. ISBN 978-0-86193-106-4.
- Greenway, Diana E. (2001). "Introduction". Fasti Ecclesiae Anglicanae 1066–1300: Volume 7: Bath and Wells. Institute of Historical Research.
- Hammond, Cynthia Imogen (2012). Architects, Angels, Activists and the City of Bath, 1765–1965. Ashgate. ISBN 978-1409400431.
- Huscroft, Richard (2004). Ruling England 1052–1216. Longman. ISBN 978-0-582-84882-5.
- Hylson-Smith, Kenneth (2003). Bath Abbey A History. Bath: The Friends of Bath Abbey.
- Jackson, Thomas Graham (1975). Gothic Architecture in France, England, and Italy. CUP Archive. ISBN 978-0878171064.
- Knowles, David (2004). The Monastic Order in England: A History of its Development from the Times of St Dunstan to the Fourth Lateran Council 940–1216. Cambridge University Press. ISBN 978-0-521-54808-3.
- Luxford, Julian M (2000). "In Dreams: The sculptural iconography of the west front of Bath Abbey reassessed". Religion and the Arts. 4 (3): 314–336. doi:10.1163/156852901750359103.
- Luxford, Julian M. (2003). "More on the Sculpture of the West Front of Bath Abbey: Christ of the Charter and Antichrist". Religion and the Arts. 7 (3): 299–322. doi:10.1163/156852903322694654.
- Mason, Emma (2005). William II: Rufus, The Red King. NPI Media Group. ISBN 978-0-7524-3528-2.
- Page, William, ed. (1911). "Houses of Benedictine monks: The cathedral priory of Bath". A History of the County of Somerset: Volume 2. Institute of Historical Research. Archived from the original on 27 October 2011.
- Perkins, Thomas (1901). The abbey churches of Bath & Malmesbury and the church of Saint Laurence, Bradford-on-Avon (1901) (PDF). G. Bell.
- Powicke, Maurice (1939). Handbook of British Chronology. Royal Historical Society. ISBN 0-901050-17-2.
- Robinson, W. J. (1916). West Country Churches. Bristol Times and Mirror.
- Smith, R. A. L. (1942). "John of Tours, Bishop of Bath 1088–1122". Downside Review. 70 (2): 132–141. doi:10.1177/001258064206000202. S2CID 187468873.
- Taylor, Ann (1999). Bath Abbey 1499–1999 Quincentenary Celebrations. Bath Abbey.
- Williams, Ann (2000). The English and the Norman Conquest. Boydell Press. ISBN 978-0-85115-708-5.
- Wright, Reginald W.M. (1975). Bath Abbey. Pitkin Unichrome. ISBN 978-0853720546.
- Wroughton, John (2006). Tudor Bath: Life and strife in the little city, 1485–1603. Lansdown Press. ISBN 0-9520249-6-9.
