= Robert Vertue =

English architect

- Died: 1506
- Occupation: Architect
- Buildings: Bath Abbey, Greenwich Palace

Robert Vertue (died in 1506) was an English architect and master mason.

He worked as a mason on the nave of Westminster Abbey between 1475 and 1490, and then as the master mason for Henry VII's riverside north range of Greenwich Palace, built in 1500–1504.

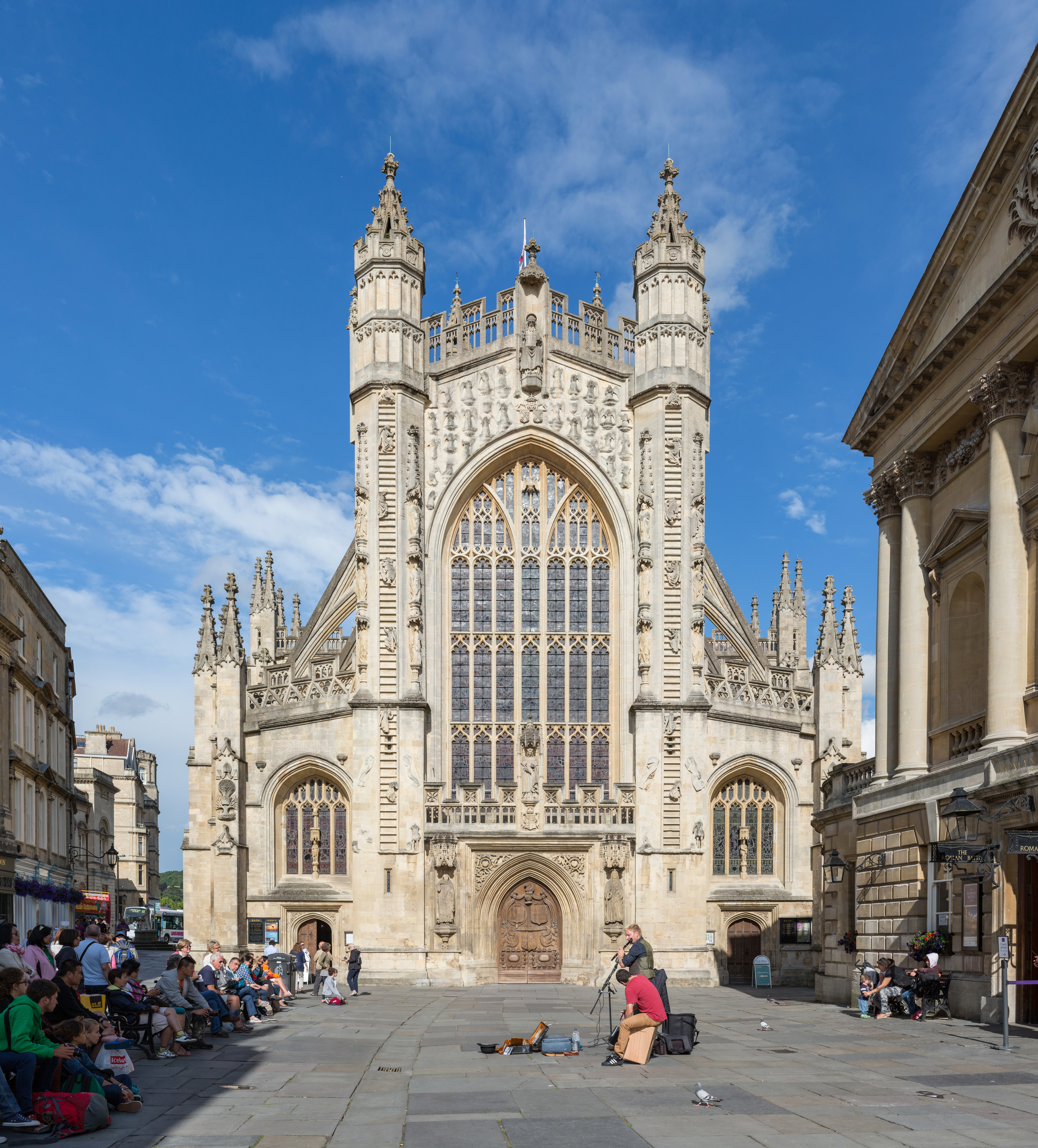
The west front of Bath Abbey

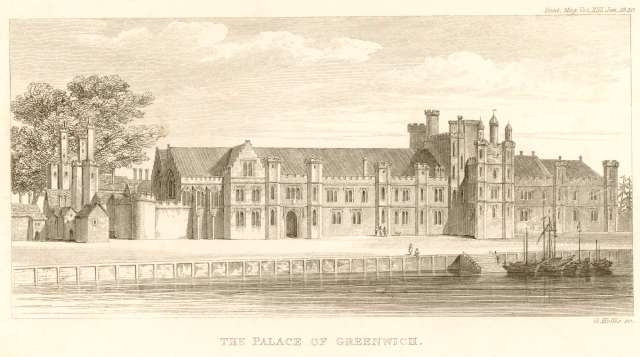
An 1840 engraving of Greenwich Palace

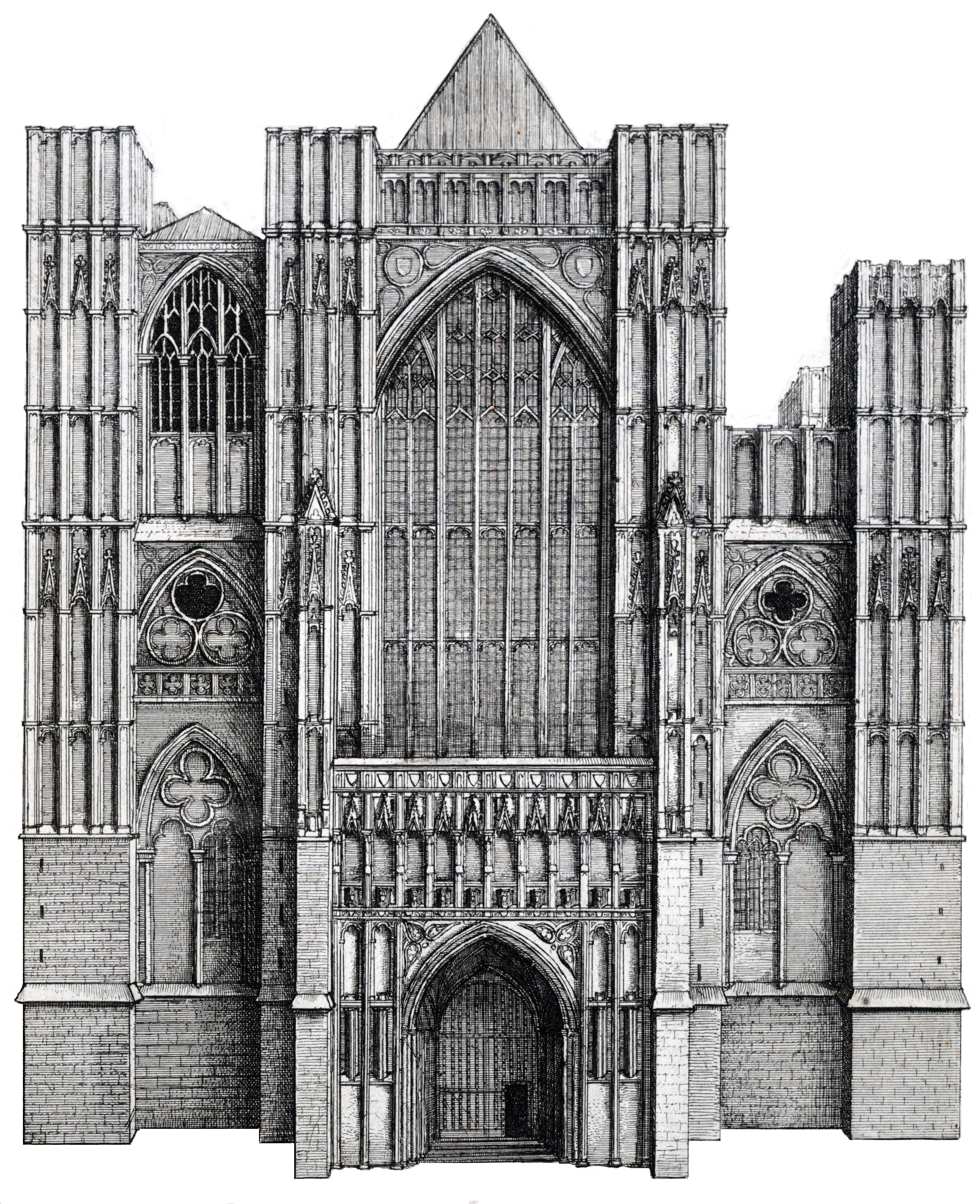
Hollar's engraving of Westminster Abbey as it stood after construction was abandoned at the Dissolution

Along with his brother William, he was involved in the construction of Bath Abbey, work at the Tower of London (1501–1502) and possibly Henry VII's chapel at Westminster, though construction continued after his death in 1506.
