= William Vertue =

English architect

- Died: 1527
- Occupation: Architect
- Buildings: Bath Abbey, St George's Chapel, Windsor, Henry VII Chapel

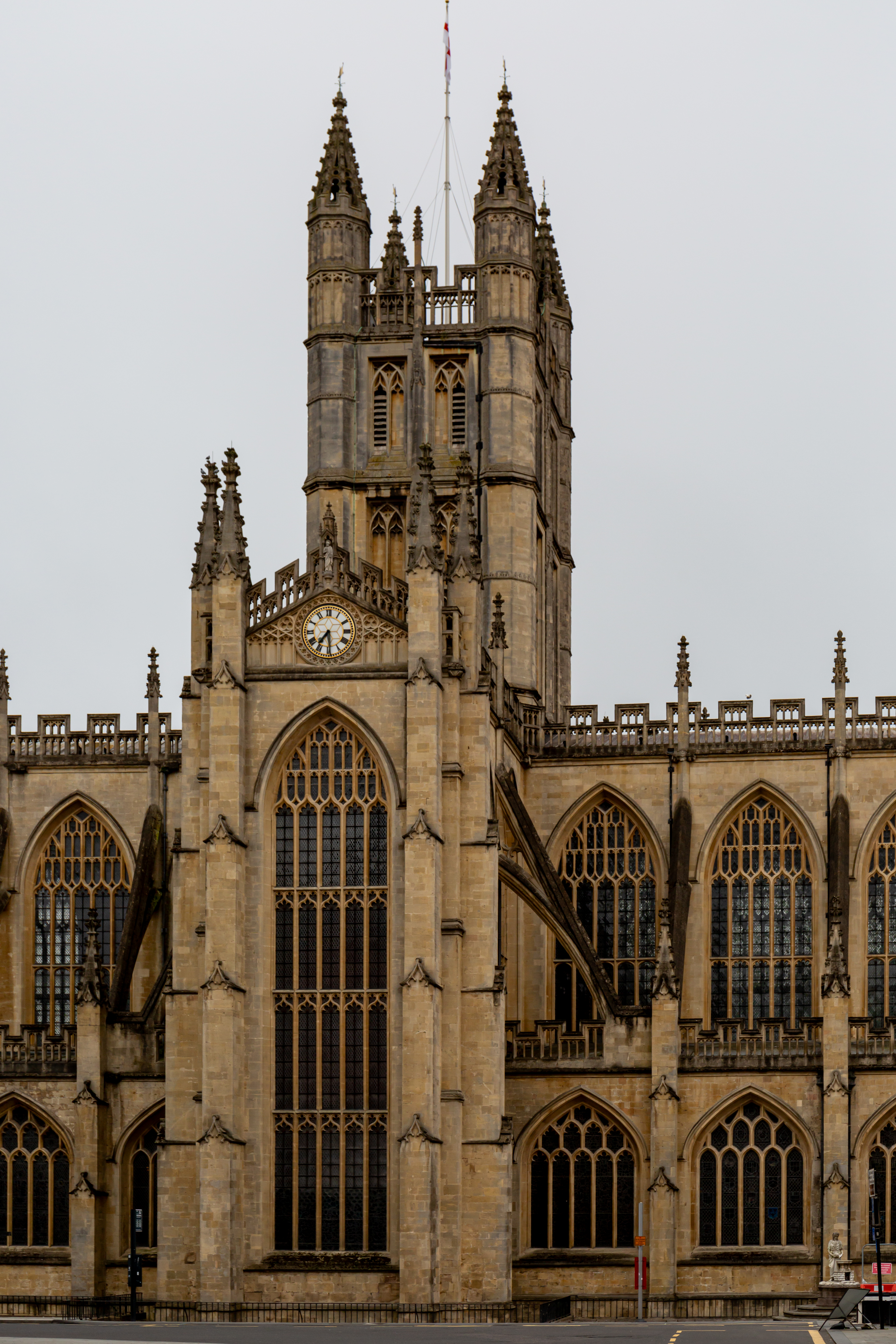
Bath Abbey

William Vertue (died 1527) was an English master mason specialising in fan vaults.

Along with his brother Robert, he was involved in the construction of Bath Abbey. The Vertue brothers are reported as telling Bishop Oliver King, the patron of the work, of the vaulting that "Ther shal be no one so goodeley, neither in England nor in France". Vertue designed the vaulting and the clerestory windows and walls of the Henry VII's chapel at Westminster, between 1506 and 1509; as Robert Vertue died in 1506, William is thought to be entirely responsible.

William may have advised John Wastell on the design for the fan vaulted ceiling at King's College Chapel, Cambridge, though the design of that vault is thought to be entirely Wastell's. He was also involved in work at the Tower of London in 1501-02. The fan vault over the crossing at St George's Chapel, Windsor Castle, finished in 1528, after his death, was his last known architectural work.

== Gallery of architectural work ==
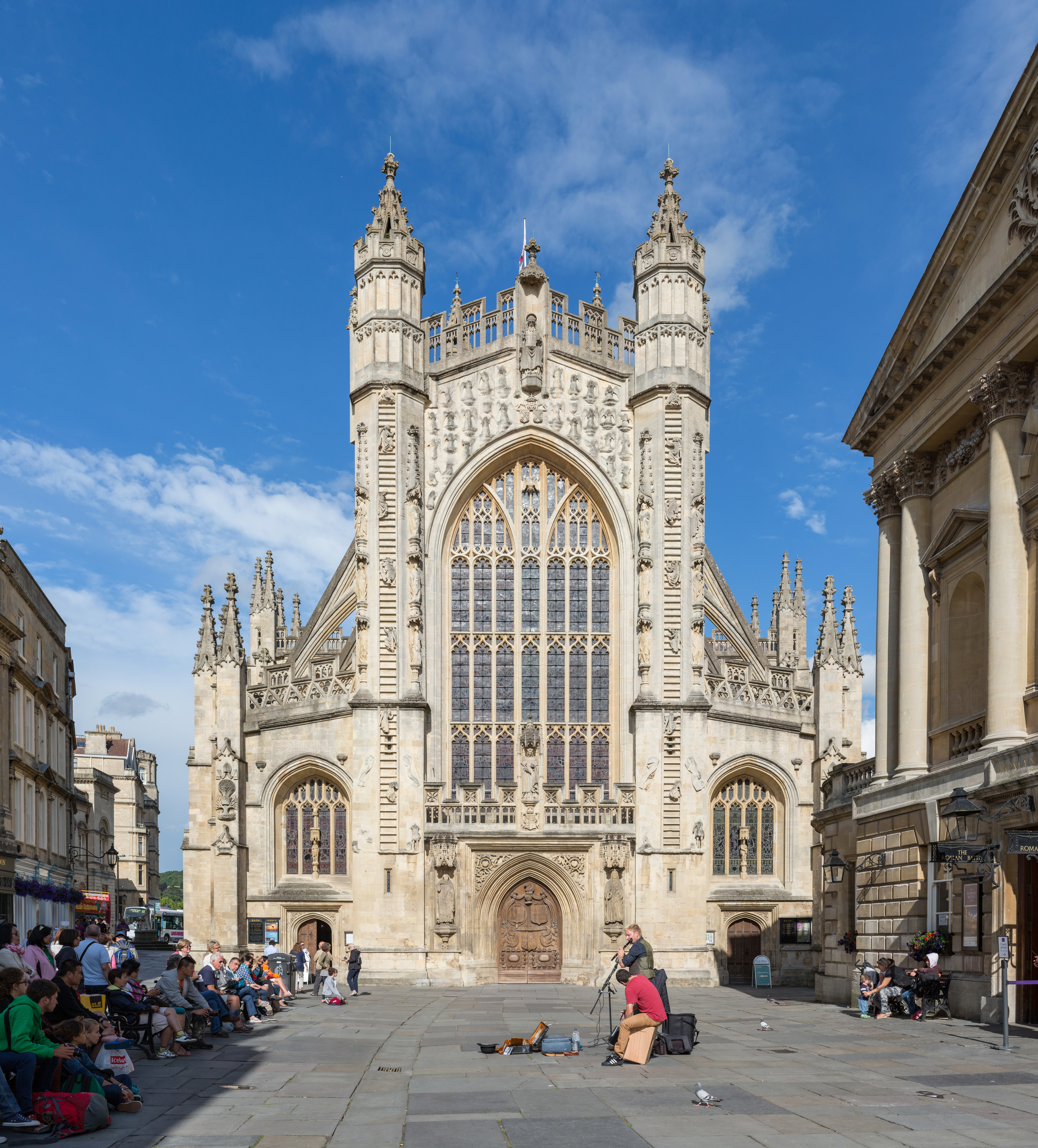
Bath Abbey, west front

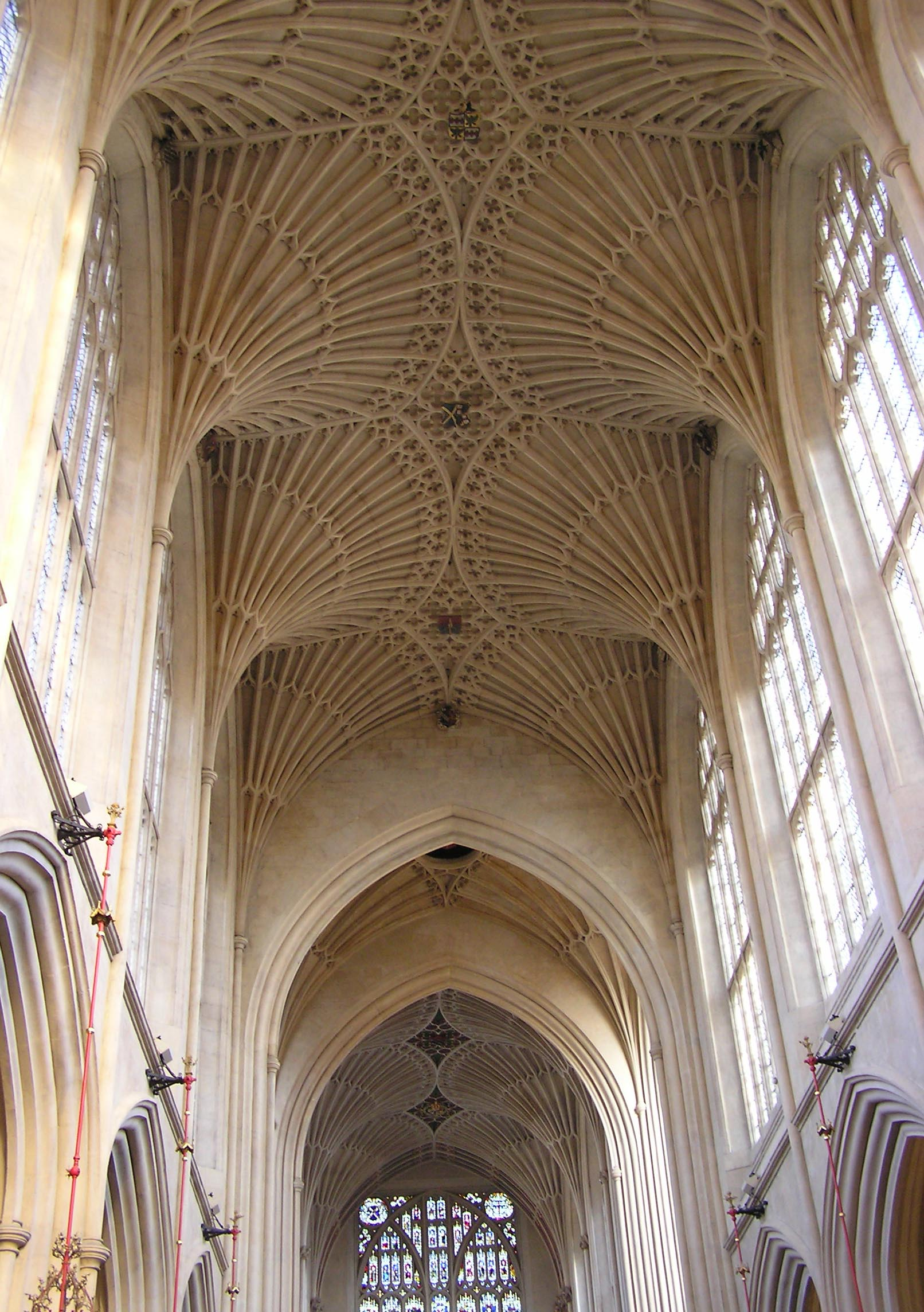
Fan Vault, Bath Abbey, the vault by Vertue is in the distance, in the chancel, the nearer vault is a Victorian copy by Sir George Gilbert Scott

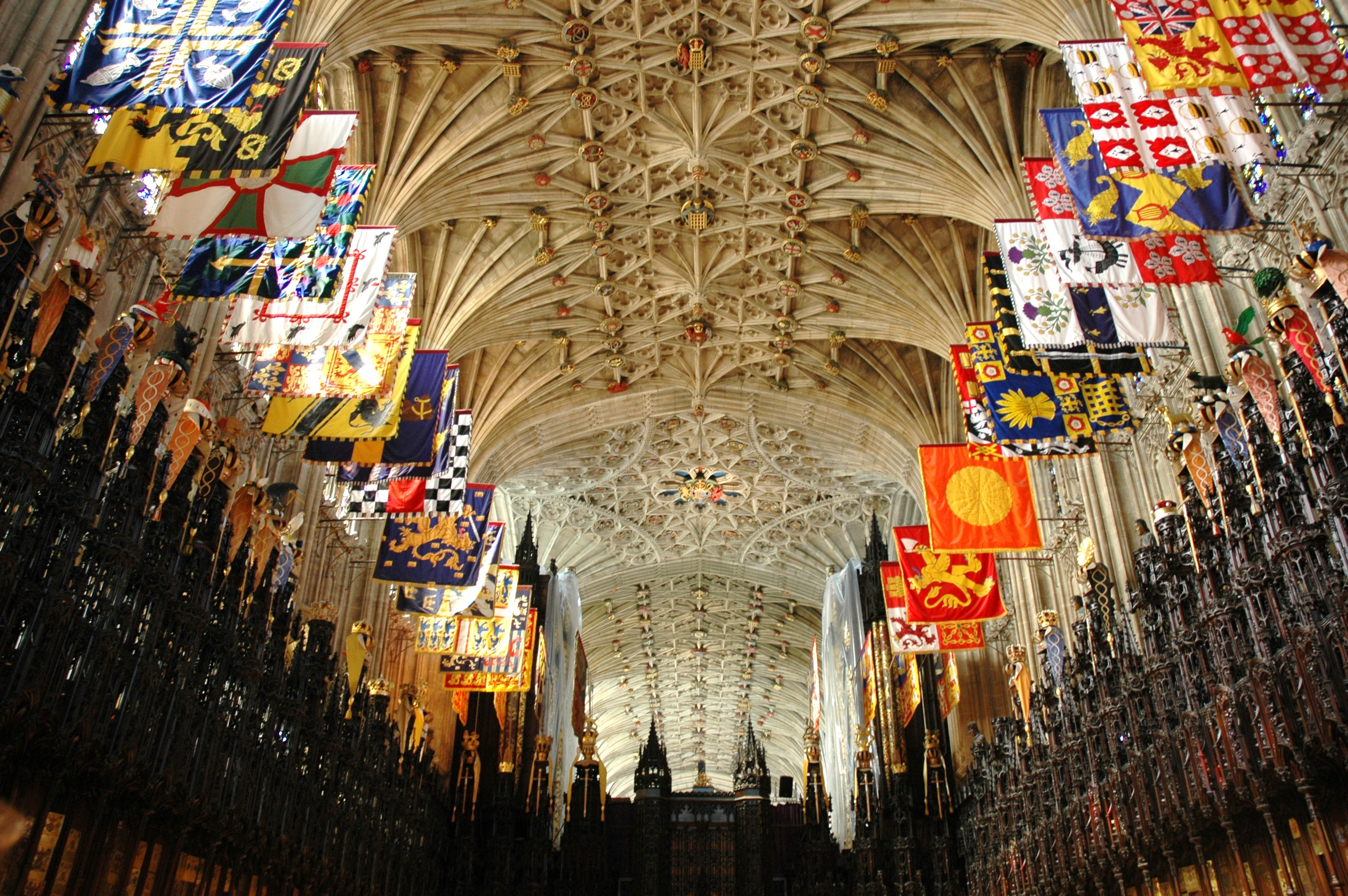
St. George's Chapel, Windsor Castle, vaulting, the vault by Vertue is the fan vault over the crossing

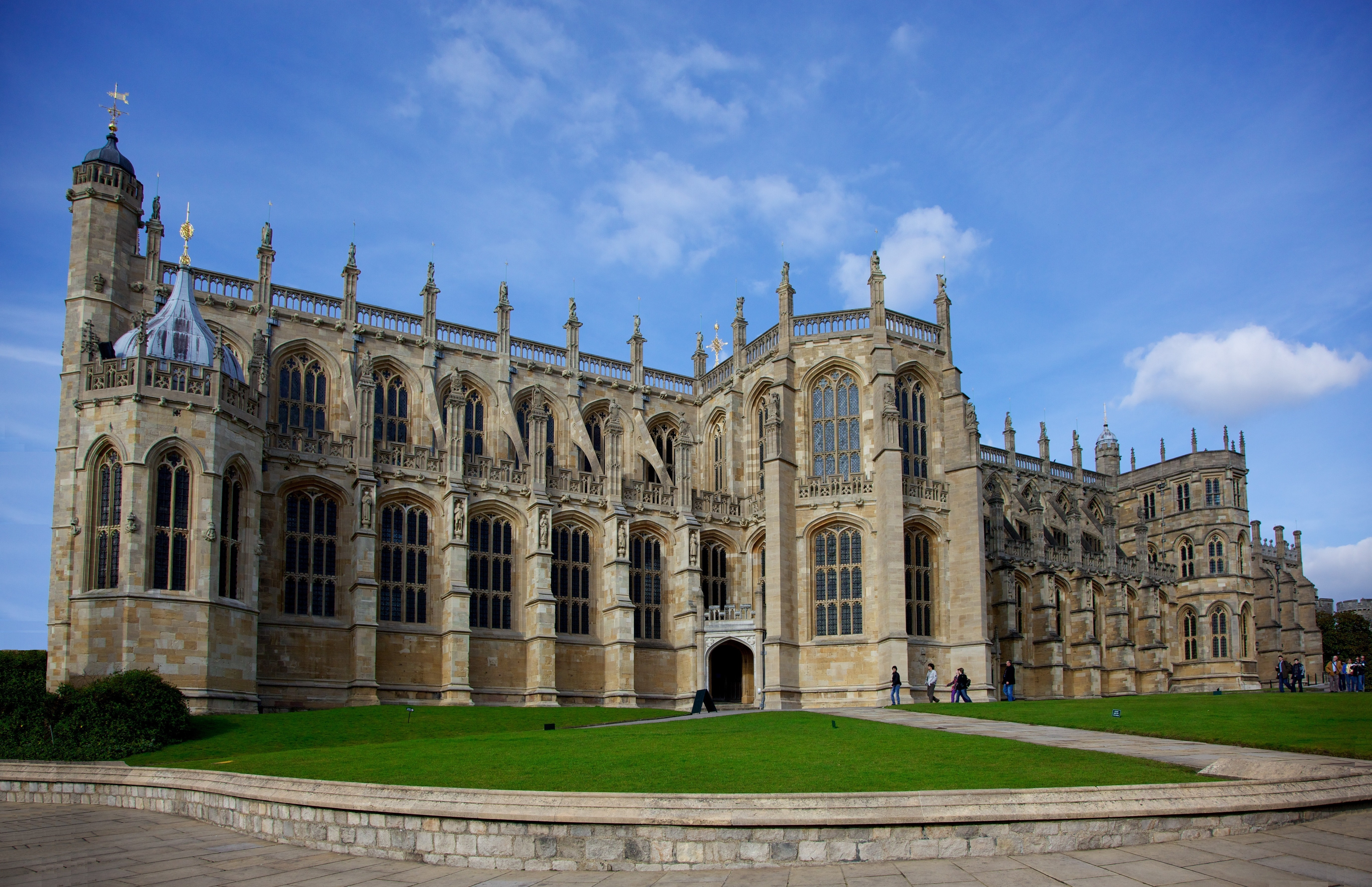
St George's Chapel, Windsor, exterior

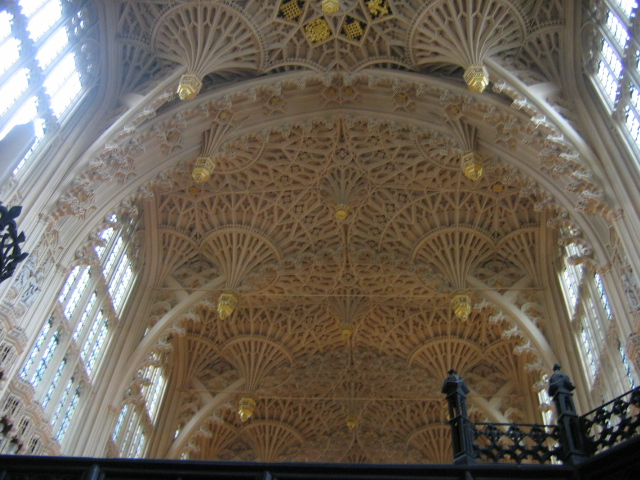
Henry VII's Chapel, Westminster Abbey, main vault

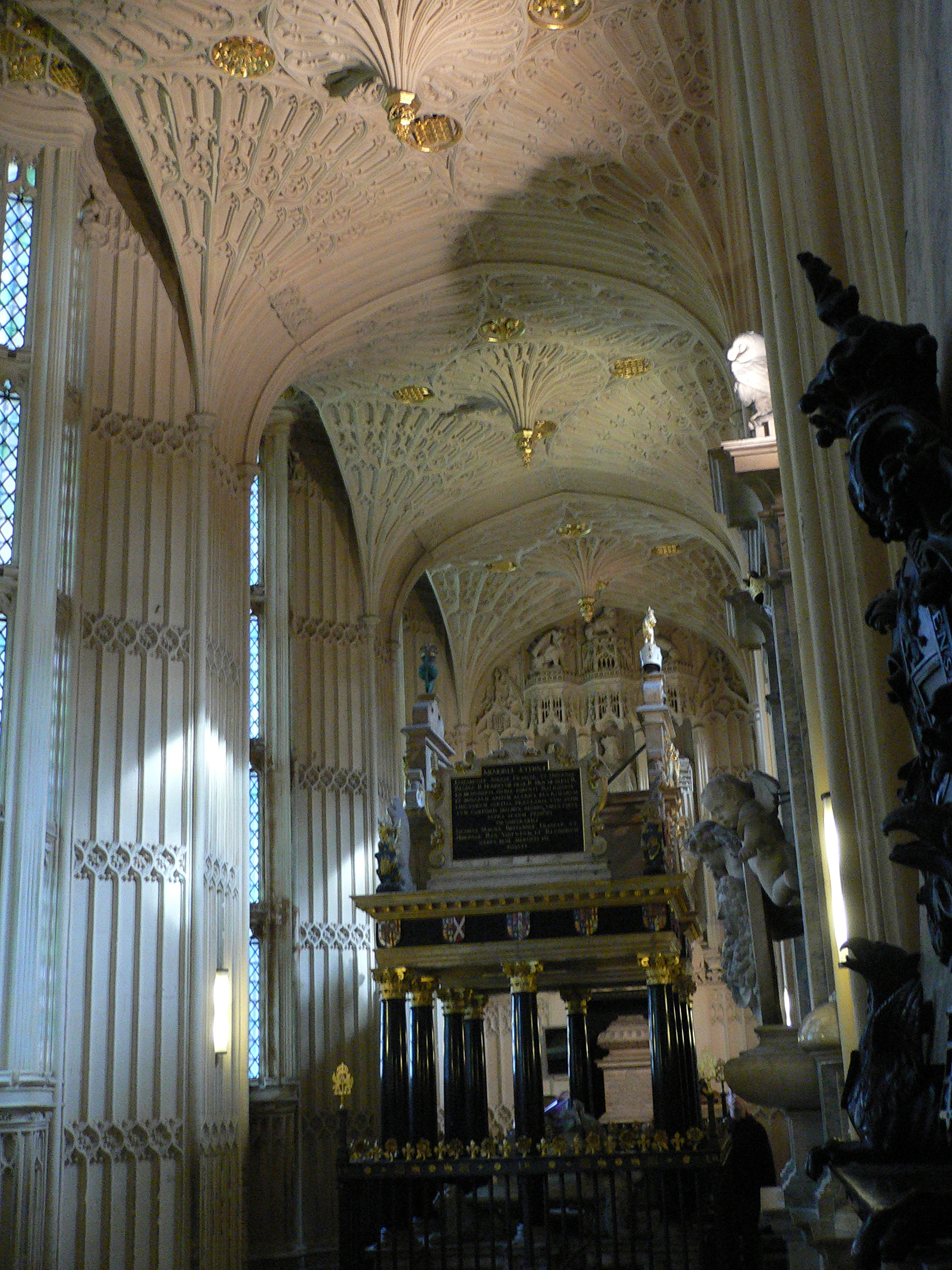
Henry VII's Chapel, Westminster Abbey, aisle vault

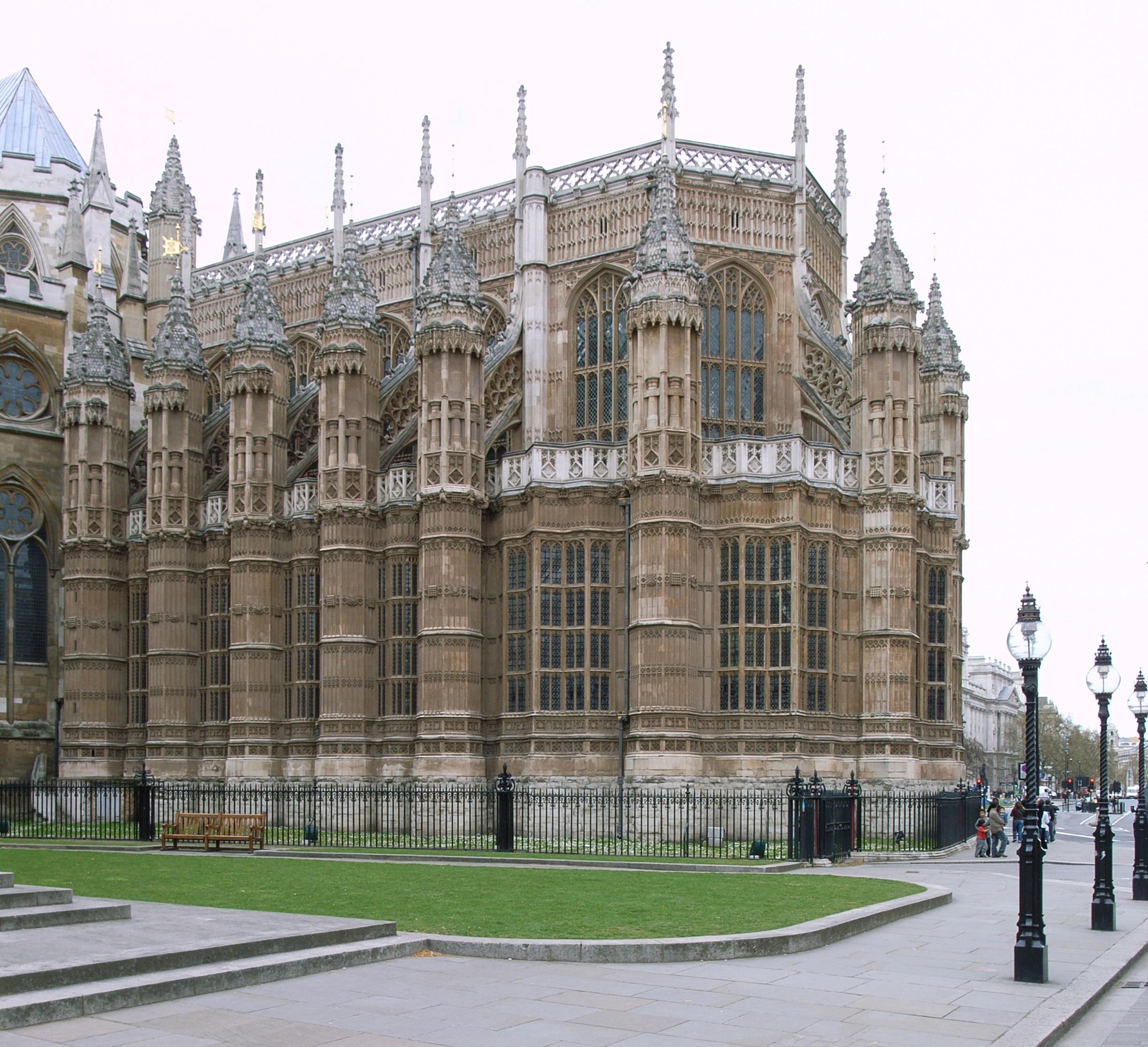
Henry VII's Chapel, Westminster Abbey, exterior from the south-east

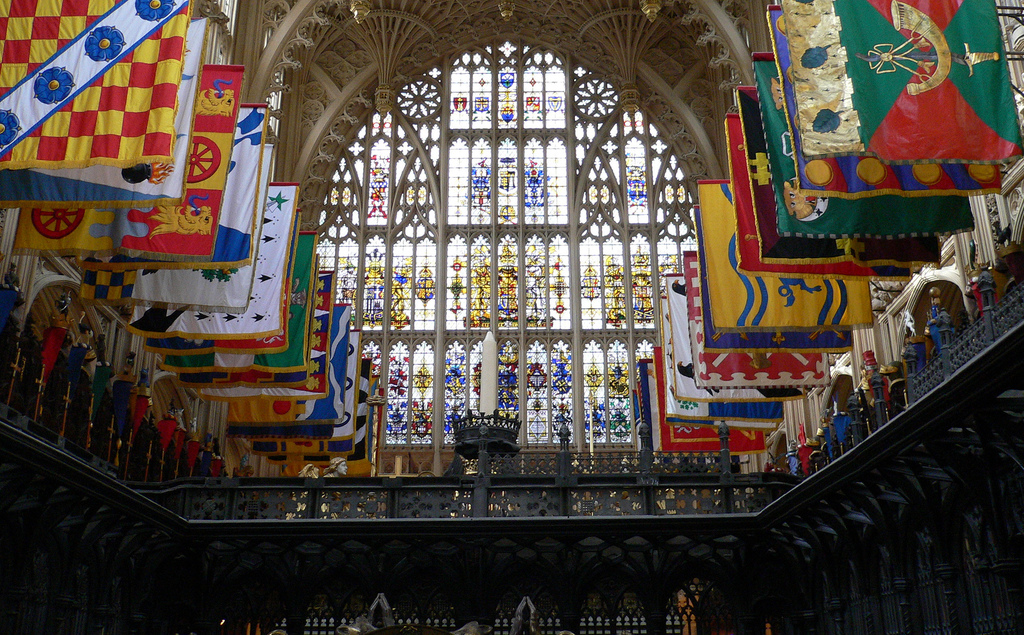
Henry VII's chapel, Westminster Abbey, interior looking west
