= Richard Meredith (priest) =

English Anglican clergyman

Richard Meredith (1559 – 15 August 1621) was an English Anglican clergyman, who served as a dean of Wells Cathedral. He began his studies at Winchester College in 1573. In 1576, he matriculated at New College, Oxford, and in 1578 became a fellow of New College. He probably graduated Bachelor of Civil Law on 1 July 1584 and Bachelor of Divinity on 17 November 1606. He served as rector of St. Peter and St. Paul in Bath and of St Peter's Church, Portishead in Somerset. He was chaplain for King James I and became dean of Wells in 1607. On 11 and 25 February 1606/7 he preached before the king at Whitehall. The two sermons were later published together in one volume. He died on 15 August 1621 and was buried in Wells Cathedral.
