= William St Lawrence =

William St Lawrence may refer to:

- William St Lawrence, 12th Baron Howth (1628–1671), Irish nobleman
- William St Lawrence, 14th Baron Howth (1688–1748), Irish peer and politician
- William St Lawrence, 2nd Earl of Howth (1752–1822), Anglo-Irish peer
- William St Lawrence, 4th Earl of Howth (1827–1909), Irish peer
