= General Lawrence =

General Lawrence may refer to:

- Charles Lawrence (British Army officer) (1709–1760), British Army brigadier general
- Craig Lawrence (born 1963), British Army major general
- George St Patrick Lawrence (1804–1884), British Indian Army lieutenant general
- Herbert Lawrence (1861–1943), British Army general
- James F. Lawrence Jr. (1918–2006), U.S. Marine Corps brigadier general
- Richard D. Lawrence (1930–2016), U.S. Army lieutenant general
- Stringer Lawrence (1698–1775), British East India Company major general

== See also ==
- Attorney General Lawrence (disambiguation)
- Christopher St Lawrence, 10th Baron Howth (c. 1568–1619), Anglo-Irish general
- Richard St Lawrence, 7th Baron Howth (c. 1510–1558), Irish general
