= Nicholas St Lawrence =

Nicholas St Lawrence may refer to:

- Nicholas St Lawrence, 4th Baron Howth (c. 1460–1526)
- Nicholas St Lawrence, 9th Baron Howth (c. 1550–1607)
- Nicholas St Lawrence, 11th Baron Howth (1597–1643)
