= Thomas St Lawrence =

Thomas St Lawrence may refer to:

- Thomas St Lawrence (bishop), bishop of Cork and Ross
- Thomas St. Lawrence (judge), statesman and judge in Ireland
- Thomas St Lawrence, 13th Baron Howth, Irish nobleman
- Thomas St Lawrence, 1st Earl of Howth, Anglo-Irish peer and lawyer
- Thomas St Lawrence, 3rd Earl of Howth, Irish peer
