= The Old Courthouse, Howth =

Former place of worship, later courthouse, near Dublin

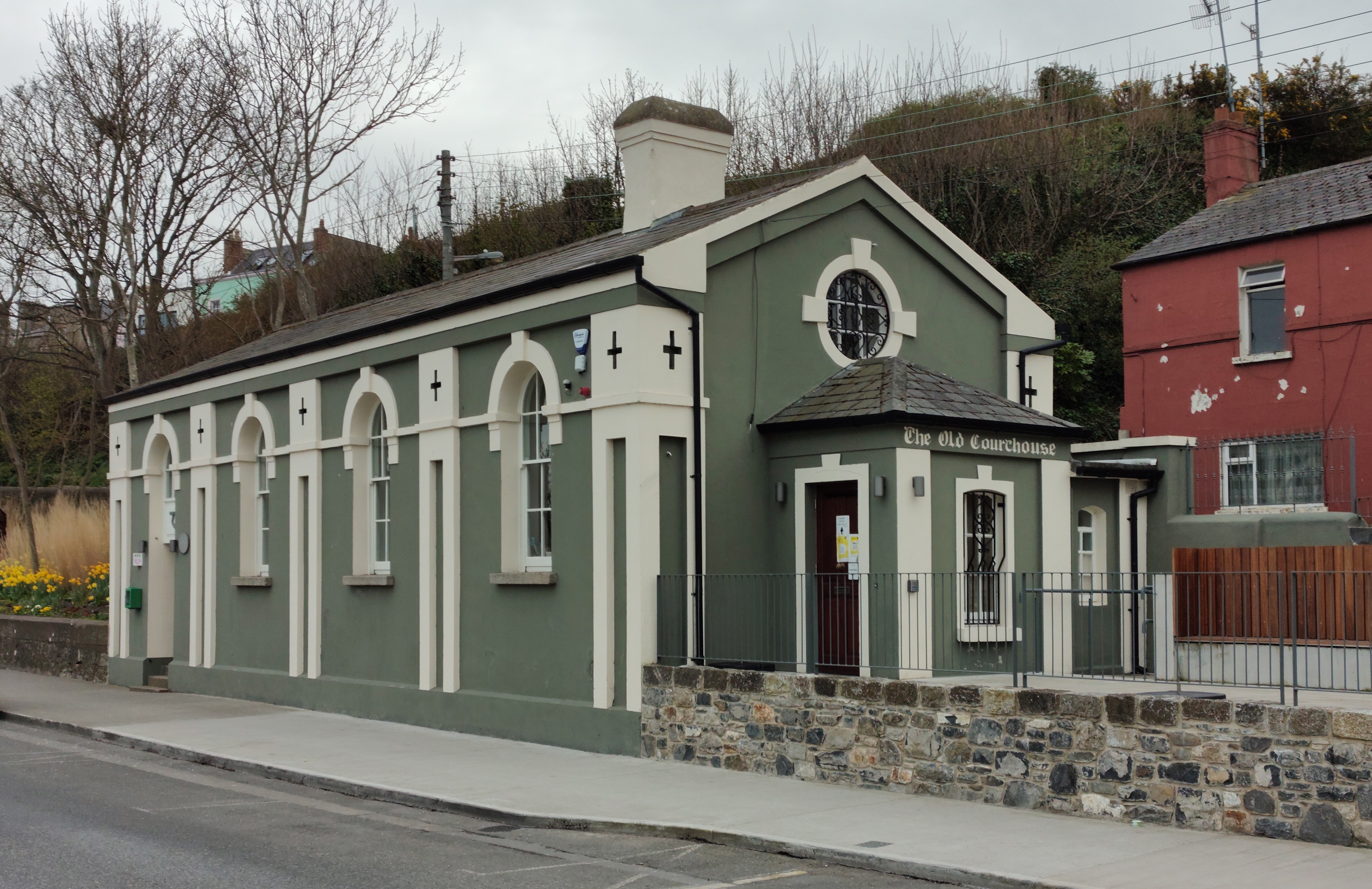
- Interactive map of the The Old Courthouse, Howth area

General information
- Location: Howth; County Dublin
- Coordinates: 53.38830°N 6.07056°W
- Estimated completion: 1868

Design and construction
- Architect: Sandham Symes (1868)
- Main contractor: Campbell & Lyons (1868)

The Old Courthouse in Howth is a former place of worship that was subsequently used as a courthouse.

It was built around 1845 and initially served as a place of worship for fishermen, before being used as a rent collection office by agents of Lord Howth.

It opened for petty sessions on 21 September 1868 and continued in use until 1970. It is located at the junction of Harbour Road and Church Street. The building is a protected structure under Part IV of the Planning & Development Act 2000 with RPS 567. It is part of the Howth Historic Core Architectural Statement of Character.

It was refurbished in early 2020 as a tourist centre.
