= John Leslie (bishop of Kilmore, Elphin and Ardagh) =

Irish bishop (1772-1854)

The Most Reverend and Right Honourable John Powell Leslie
- Born: 12 October 1772; Glaslough, County Monaghan, Ireland
- Died: 22 July 1854 (aged 81); Kilmore, County Cavan
- Education: Christ Church, Oxford
- Spouse: Isabella St. Lawrence
- Children: 8, including Emma, Charles Leslie and John Leslie
- Parents: Charles Leslie (father); Prudence Leslie (mother)
- Relatives: Charles Leslie (great-grandfather)
- Bishop of Kilmore, Elphin and Ardagh
- Installed: 1841
- Term ended: 1854
- Predecessor: First to hold office
- Successor: Marcus Gervais Beresford

Orders
- Consecration: 26 January 1812 by William Stuart

Personal details
- Denomination: Church of Ireland
- Profession: Priest

John Powell Leslie (12 October 1772 – 22 July 1854) was a bishop in the Church of Ireland. His great-grandfather was Charles Leslie, a noted Non-Juror member of the Church of Ireland and one of the most prominent Jacobite propagandists after the 1688 Glorious Revolution.

== Life ==
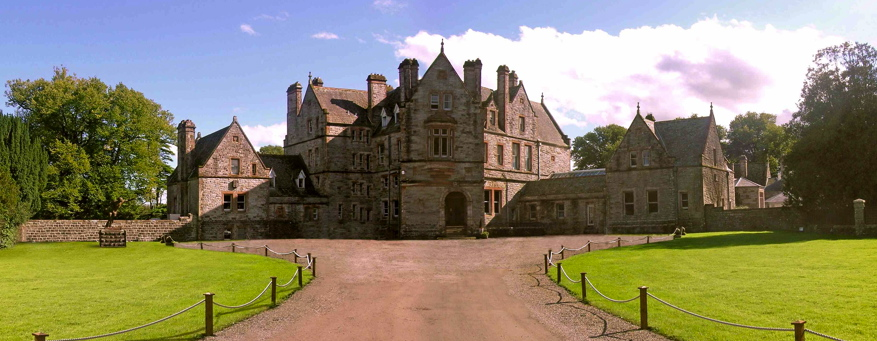
Castle Leslie, the family estate in Glaslough

Powell Leslie was the second son and one of twelve surviving children born to Charles Powell Leslie (1731-1800) and Prudence Leslie (1745 - ?). The Leslies were a numerous and prolific family with a long history of service in the Church of Ireland; his great-grandfather was Charles Leslie, a noted Non-Juror member of the Church of Ireland and one of the most prominent Jacobite propagandists after the 1688 Glorious Revolution.

Born 12 October 1772 on the family estate at Glaslough, County Monaghan, John married Isabella St Lawrence (1790-1830), daughter of Thomas St Lawrence, Bishop of Cork and Ross and his wife Frances Coghlan, and granddaughter of the 1st Earl of Howth, and they had eight children.

In 1807, Leslie was appointed Dean of St Fin Barre's, Cork and then Bishop of Dromore in 1812, a position briefly held by his distant relative Robert Leslie in 1661. In 1819, his elder brother Charles, a prominent supporter of Lord Liverpool's government unsuccessfully petitioned for him to be made Bishop of Clogher, which included the family estate at Glaslough.

This went to Lord John Beresford, later Primate of All-Ireland and John had to wait until 1820 when he was made Bishop of Elphin before becoming the first bishop of the united diocese of Bishop of Kilmore, Elphin and Ardagh in 1841. He died in office on 22 July 1854.

His son Charles Leslie was also briefly Bishop of Kilmore, Elphin and Ardagh; he was enthroned on 24 April 1870 but died a few months later on 8 July. Another son, John junior, was a first-class cricketer. His daughter Emma Toke was a hymnwriter.
