= Christopher St Lawrence, 8th Baron Howth =

Irish politician and peer (died 1589)

Christopher St Lawrence, 8th Baron Howth (died 1589) was an Irish politician and peer. He was a member of the Privy Council of Ireland, and played a leading part in the Government of Ireland in the 1560s, but he later went into opposition and was imprisoned as a result. He was nicknamed the Blind Lord.

He was a man of intelligence and some learning, who is believed to have written part of the historical compilation called The Book of Howth. On the other hand, he was notorious for his domestic cruelty: he was imprisoned and fined for severely ill-treating his wife and for causing the death of his teenage daughter through his ill-treatment of her.

== Early life ==
He was born sometime after 1509, the third of the four sons of Christopher St Lawrence, 5th Baron Howth and his wife Anne Bermingham of Baldongan. He was the brother of Edward St Lawrence, 6th Baron Howth and Richard St Lawrence, 7th Baron Howth. Since he was a younger son without much prospect of inheriting the title, not a great deal is recorded of his early years. He entered Lincoln's Inn in 1544 and was practising at the English bar ten years later: his legal knowledge later made him an effective leader of the opposition to the Crown's Irish policies. It is not known when he was afflicted with blindness, nor whether he went totally blind. By 1556 he had returned to Ireland and was managing one of the family estates. He succeeded to the barony in 1558 on the death of his brother Richard without issue.

== Politician ==
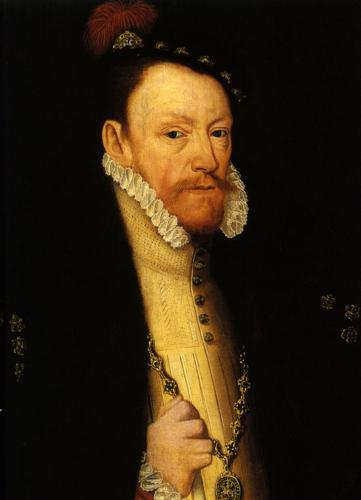
Thomas Radclyffe, 3rd Earl of Sussex, Lord Deputy of Ireland, and a key ally of Lord Howth

The Barons of Howth were always well positioned to play a major part in Irish politics: Christopher had the additional advantage of enjoying the trust of the Lord Deputy of Ireland, the Earl of Sussex. He was made a member of the Privy Council immediately after the accession of Elizabeth I and sat in her first Irish Parliament in 1560. Sussex sent him to negotiate with Shane O'Neill, the effective ruler of Ulster, in 1561: Howth persuaded O'Neill to go to London and submit himself to the Queen's mercy, although little good came of this in the long run. Howth himself went to London the following year to discuss Irish affairs with the Queen. By his own account Elizabeth at first treated him with great suspicion, simply because he was an Irishman, but he succeeded in winning her trust. He was confirmed in the title Baron of Howth and later knighted. After Sussex's recall from Ireland, he continued to enjoy the confidence of the Lord Justice of Ireland, Sir Nicholas Arnold, who sent him to negotiate with the O'Reilly clan.

== Opposition ==
The 1570s were a time of conflict between Sussex's successor as Lord Deputy, Sir Henry Sidney, and the Anglo-Irish nobility over his taxation policies, and especially over the cess, the tax for maintaining garrisons in the towns of the Pale. Howth, despite his previous record of loyalty to the Crown, emerged as one of the leaders of the opposition, and gave grave offence to the Queen as a result. Summoned before the Council, he argued that according to his understanding of the law (and he was of course a qualified barrister) Sidney's proposals were unconstitutional. He was imprisoned for 5 months in Dublin Castle, and then made a full submission to the Crown, arguing that he had never intended to question the Royal Prerogative or the Queen's power to tax her Irish subjects. After a sharp rebuke he was allowed to go free, but it is unlikely that he was ever fully trusted again, and it may be that his later prosecution for domestic cruelty had to some extent political motives behind it.

== Charges of domestic cruelty ==
In 1579 Nicholas Terrell, a servant of Lord Howth, was convicted of perjury. In the course of the trial there was a good deal of evidence about Howth's cruelty to his wife, and the Lord Chancellor of Ireland, Sir William Gerard, ordered a further investigation into these allegations, which resulted in a full hearing before the Court of Castle Chamber, the Irish equivalent of Star Chamber. It is not entirely clear why Castle Chamber, which in theory dealt only with cases of riot and other offences against public order, intervened in a private family law case (although in practice Castle Chamber did hear many private lawsuits). Allegations were also made about his dissolute private life, although these would normally be a matter for the ecclesiastical courts.

The evidence showed that Howth had assaulted his wife so often and so severely that she had fled in fear of her life and taken refuge with her brother. On one occasion he had beaten her so badly that she had been unable to leave her bed for two weeks, and he had given her another severe beating before she had fully recovered from the first. Even more serious was the evidence that he had beaten his 13-year-old daughter Jane so badly that she died as a result- "some said he gave her forty strokes, some said sixty, on her bare back". His other children also lived in fear of him. Howth in his defence pleaded that his treatment of his wife was nothing out of the ordinary, while Jane had died of a fever, unrelated to the beatings, which he admitted to having administered.

Howth was found guilty of both charges, of cruelty to his wife and of causing the death of his daughter. He was sentenced to a brief term of imprisonment and fined heavily; he was ordered to pay alimony to his wife, who was allowed to live apart from him and was given custody of the children. While the Government in imposing these penalties may have intended to rebuke Howth for his opposition to its taxation policy, the verdict also suggests that the Court felt genuine sympathy for Lady Howth and her daughter.

== Last years ==
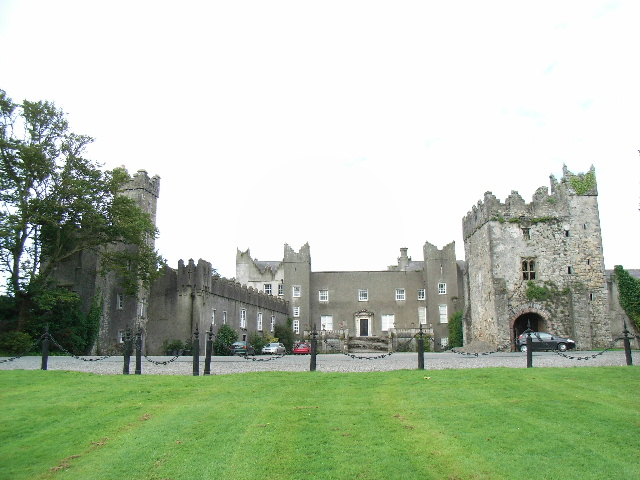
Howth Castle

In the 1580s Howth briefly resumed his role as leader of the opposition, and succeeded in temporarily blocking further proposals for tax reform by the Lord Deputy, Sir John Perrot. On this occasion he was quickly brought to admit his faults: he was reconciled with Perrot, and sent him a present of a goshawk, a bird which has always been a great rarity in Ireland.

He died on 24 October 1589 and was buried in Howth Abbey; his tomb has an effigy to himself and, rather surprisingly, also to his much-abused first wife. His last will made generous bequests to servants but none of his children, except his eldest son, received anything. The reference in the will to his many and grave sins has led some to suggest that he felt genuine remorse for his ill-treatment of his wife and daughter.

== The Book of Howth ==
He owned a manuscript, the Book of Howth, which is a historical source of considerable value. It is partly a celebration of the achievements of the St. Lawrence family and partly a description of historical events such as the Battle of Knockdoe. The last part deals in detail with Howth's own career and may well have been written by him. It argues that the Anglo-Irish nobility of whom Howth clearly saw himself as a leader, are the proper rulers of Ireland in the name of the Crown: to replace them with ignorant and ill-informed English officials will simply leave the Crown at the mercy of the Old Irish, its real enemies. The Book also contains specific criticism of recent Crown policies such as the cess.

== Legend of Granuaile ==
A famous legend, which may have some basis in fact, records that about 1575 Grace O'Malley, or Granuaile, the celebrated Pirate Queen of Galway, called at Howth Castle only to find the gates barred. Outraged by the discourtesy, she kidnapped Lord Howth's heir, then a young child (this would probably have been the 8th Baron's grandson, Christopher St Lawrence, 10th Baron Howth) and held him hostage until the St. Lawrence family apologised for their lack of hospitality. To make amends Lord Howth promised that in future his gates would always be open at dinner time and a place would be set at table for unexpected guests, a tradition which later generations maintained.

== Character ==
Elrington Ball calls the eighth Lord Howth the most striking member of his family and the most forceful Irish statesman of the Elizabethan era. He does not defend his ill-treatment of his wife and daughter, but argues, rather unconvincingly, that the early years of his marriage were happy enough. Crawford takes a much more severe view of Howth's faults, arguing that his killing of his daughter Jane was certainly at least manslaughter, and possibly murder, and notes that her mother was forced to flee from home in order to avoid a similar fate.

== Family ==
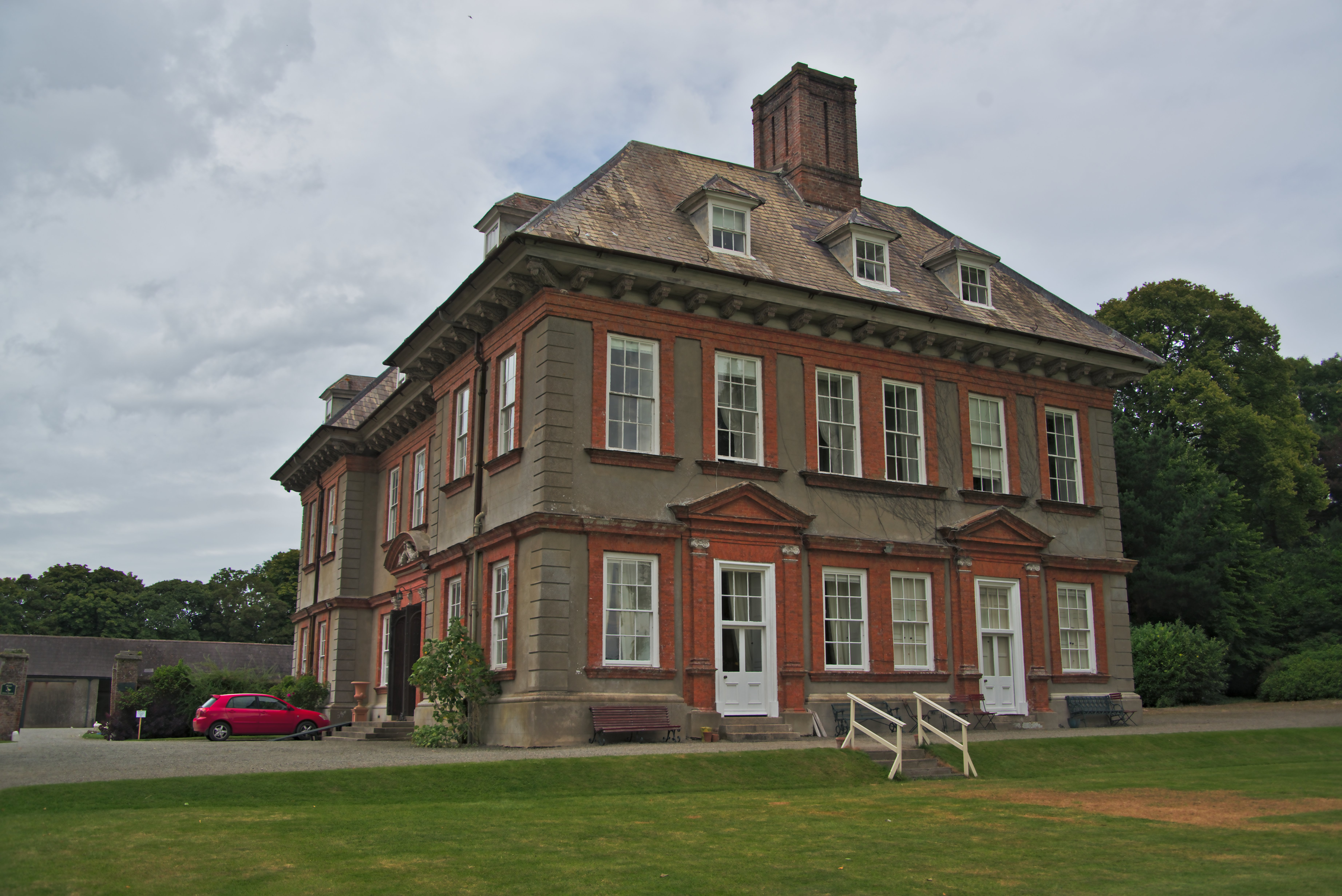
Beaulieu House, the home of Howth's first wife Elizabeth Plunket

He married firstly in 1546, Elizabeth Plunket, daughter of Sir John Plunket of Beaulieu House, County Louth and his wife Anne Barnewall, daughter of Robert Barnewall of Drimnagh. From her testimony at her husband's trial, we know that they had 14 children, but presumably several of them died in infancy, and only 8 of them can be identified with certainty:

- Nicholas St Lawrence, 9th Baron Howth (c.1550–1607)
- Thomas (died 1600), who was killed at the Battle of Moyry Pass
- Leonard (died 1608), who married Anne Eustace
- Richard, who married a daughter of Francis Corby
- Margaret, who married firstly William Fitzwilliam and secondly Michael Berford
- Mary, who married Sir Patrick Barnewall of Turvey (the marriage was annulled in 1579; she evidently did not remarry)
- Elizabeth
- Jane, who died in 1577, aged only 13, a victim of her father's ill-treatment.

He married secondly, after 1579, Cecily Cusack, daughter of Henry Cusack, alderman of Dublin. She outlived him by many years, dying in 1638, and remarried twice. By her second husband John Barnewall (died 1599), younger son of Sir Christopher Barnewall, she had a son Patrick.

Peerage of Ireland
Preceded by Richard St Lawrence	Baron Howth; 1558–1589	Succeeded by Nicholas St Lawrence
