= Thomas Lawrence (disambiguation) =

Sir Thomas Lawrence (1769–1830) was a British artist and President of Royal Academy.

Thomas Lawrence may also refer to:

- Thomas Lawrence (field hockey), Malaysian Olympic hockey player
- Thomas Lawrence (MP), Member of Parliament for Lancashire, 1445
- Thomas Lawrence (mayor) (1689–1754), mayor of colonial Philadelphia
- Thomas Lawrence II (1720–1784), mayor of colonial Philadelphia and son of the above
- Thomas Lawrence (physician) (1711–1783), English President of the Royal College of Physicians
- T. E. Lawrence (1888–1935), "Lawrence of Arabia"
- Thomas Lawrence (Governor of Maryland) (1645–1714), Royal Governor of Maryland, 1693
- Tommy Lawrence (1940–2018), Scottish footballer
- Tom Lawrence (born 1994), footballer

== See also ==
- Thomas Laurence (1598–1657), English theologian, sometimes spelled this way
- Thomas St Lawrence (disambiguation)
