= Charles Leslie (bishop) =

Irish bishop

Charles Leslie (1810–1870) was briefly the Church of Ireland Bishop of Kilmore, Elphin and Ardagh in 1870. His father, John Leslie, was the first bishop of the diocese. His mother was Isabella St Lawrence, daughter of Thomas St Lawrence, Bishop of Cork and Ross and Frances Coghlan, and granddaughter of the first Earl of Howth. Charles Leslie never actually moved into the See House, near Kilmore Cathedral, just north-west of Cavan Town. He died at his home, Corravahan House, just outside Drung.

Religious titles
| Preceded by Hamilton Verschoyle | Bishop of Kilmore, Elphin and Ardagh; June–September 1870 | Succeeded by Thomas Carson |
