= Christopher St Lawrence, 10th Baron Howth =

Irish statesman

Christopher St Lawrence, 10th Baron Howth (c. 1568–1619) was an Irish statesman and soldier of the Elizabethan and Jacobean era. His personal charm made him a favourite of two successive English monarchs, and he was also a soldier of great courage and some ability, who fought under the Earl of Essex and Lord Mountjoy during the Nine Years' War. However, his bitter quarrels with the Lord Deputy of Ireland, his feuds with other leading families of the Anglo-Irish Pale, and his suspected involvement in the conspiracy which led to the Flight of the Earls, damaged his reputation. He is best remembered for the legend that he was kidnapped by the "Pirate Queen" Granuaile when he was a small boy.

== Early life ==
He was born about 1568, the eldest son of Nicholas, 9th Baron Howth, and his first wife Margaret, fifth daughter of Sir Christopher Barnewall of Turvey by his wife Marion Sherle. According to the legend of Granuaile he spent his childhood at Howth Castle, although his parents lived for some years at Platten in Meath. While his father was a devout and open Roman Catholic, at a time when it was politically dangerous to admit to such beliefs, the son converted to the Protestant faith sometime before 1605: his enemies maintained this was purely a matter of expediency, not religious conviction. Certainly, in later years he was happy to form an alliance with the Catholic nobility and seems to have briefly returned to the Catholic faith in 1606–7.

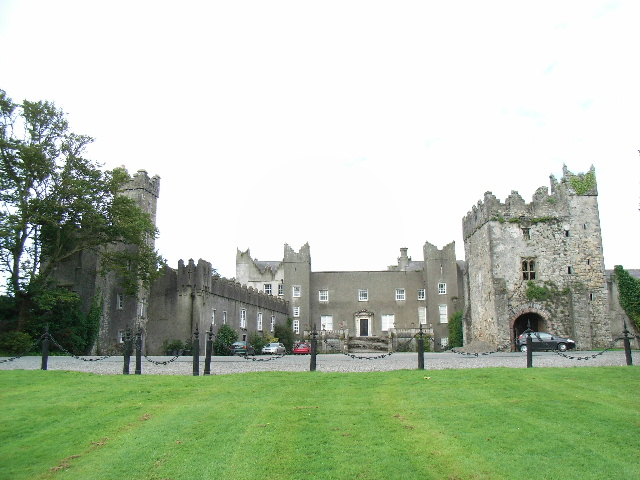
Howth Castle

== Granuaile ==
According to a celebrated legend, which probably has some basis in fact, in about the year 1576 Granuaile, the so-called Pirate Queen of Galway, arrived unannounced at Howth Castle at dinner-time, only to find the gates barred. Annoyed at the discourtesy, she took young Christopher hostage until his family apologised. To make amends, the Howth family pledged that in future the castle gates would always be open at dinner-time, and that an extra place would always be set at table for unexpected guests.

== Soldier ==
Christopher acquired a considerable reputation as a soldier, and was active on the Government side throughout the Nine Years' War, the most serious threat to the authority of the English Crown in Ireland for several generations: the rebellion was led by Hugh O'Neill, Earl of Tyrone.

In 1595 Christopher accompanied his father on an expedition against the O'Byrnes of Wicklow, and showed his courage by capturing two men. Subsequently, he spent two years in England where he was knighted. He returned to Ireland with Sir Conyers Clifford in 1597, and was given a company of cavalry. He spent much time in Offaly keeping the O'Connor clan in check: in addition, he was appointed commander of the garrison of Cavan, with power to execute martial law, and was praised for his good services there.

== Friendship with the Earl of Essex ==
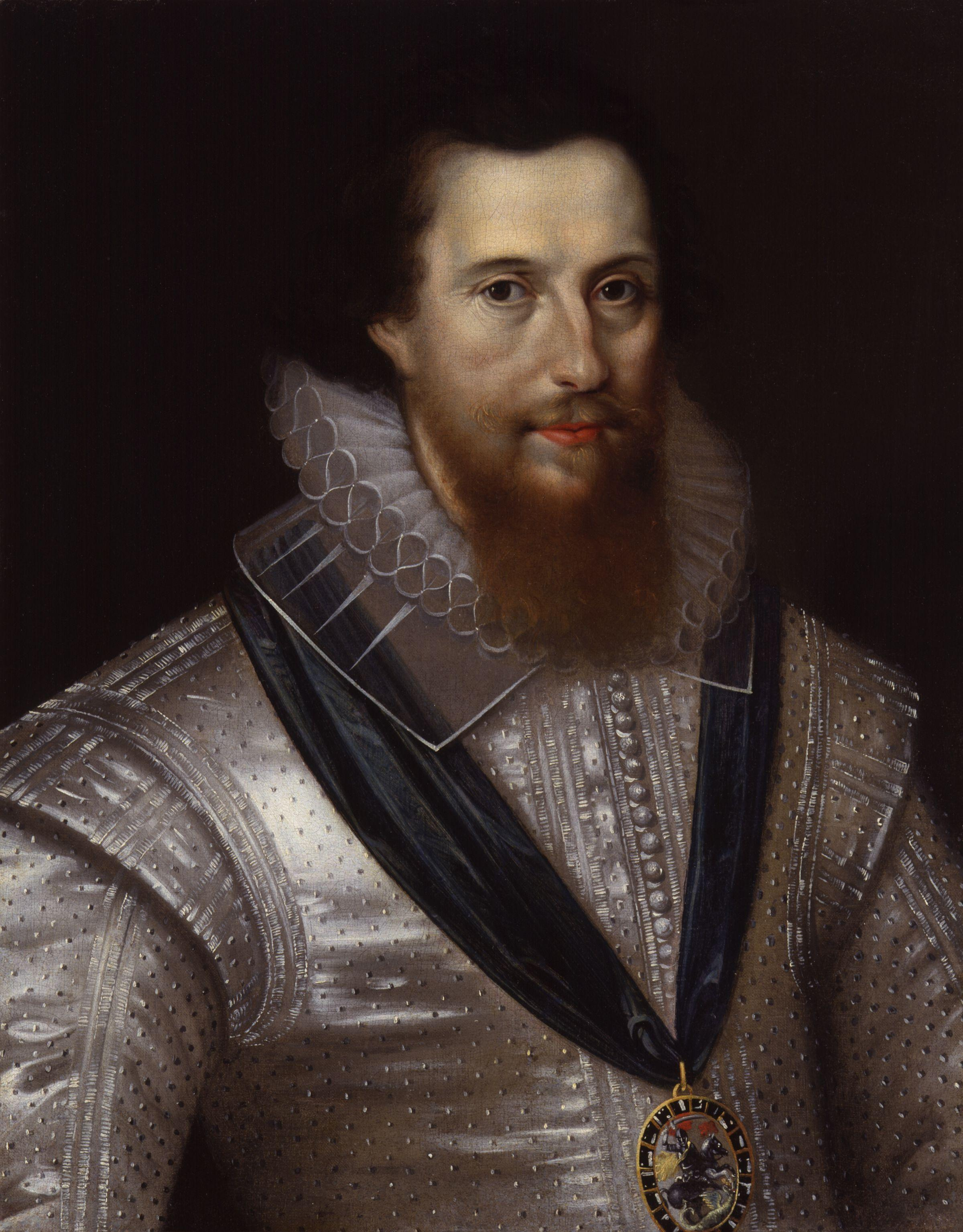
Robert Devereux, 2nd Earl of Essex

When Robert Devereux, 2nd Earl of Essex, arrived in Ireland to put down the rebellion of Hugh O'Neill, (a task in which he was to fail), Christopher served with him and became a personal friend. He distinguished himself at Athy by swimming the river Barrow to retrieve some stolen horses, and returned with the horses and the heads of two thieves. He was present at the siege of Cahir Castle, and again distinguished himself by repelling a sortie by the garrison. He also accompanied Essex on his ill-fated expedition to Ulster. Essex wrote of him as a "dear and worthy friend" and chose him as one of his few companions for his disastrous return to the English Court, after he had agreed peace terms with Hugh O'Neill, thus effectively conceding the Crown's surrender to O'Neill.

Christopher had already gained a reputation for being quarrelsome and hot-tempered: in October 1598 he was rumoured to have murdered Sir Samuel Bagenal over a trifling insult, though the story has no basis in fact. It is likely that he did offer to fight Essex's main opponents at Court, Sir Robert Cecil and Lord Grey de Wilton, and caused controversy when he publicly pledged Essex's health. On his first appearance in Court, he was so drunk that he was arrested overnight. Summoned before the Privy Council on the charge of having threatened Cecil, he denied it and was let off with an order to return to Ireland. To the jibe that he was an Irishman, he replied with unexpected dignity with a description of the awkward position of the Anglo-Irish: "an Irishman in England, an Englishman in Ireland", and asked that he be judged only for his service to the Crown. Elizabeth I consented to receive him, and though she scolded him for his "scornful journey", he clearly made a good impression on her. She granted his request to postpone his return, ordered payment of his arrears of wages, and on his return to Ireland she wrote that he was one who was "well deserved in her service". He was also reconciled with Robert Cecil.

== Service with Mountjoy ==
In 1600 he was sent to assist Sir George Carew in his military campaign in Connaught. His reputation as a soldier grew, but so did his reputation for violence: he was said to have engaged in a brawl with Thomas Butler, 10th Earl of Ormond and Donogh O'Brien, 4th Earl of Thomond. The supposed cause was that Christopher was over-friendly with Ormond's wife (presumably this was his third wife, Helena Barry, whom he had married in 1601). The downfall and execution of Essex did not, as might have been expected, ruin Howth's career.

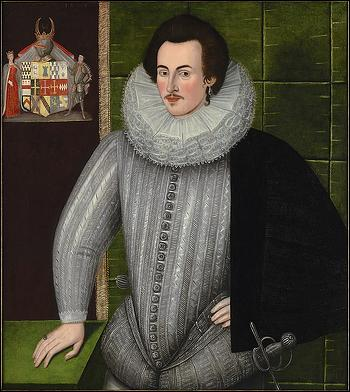
Charles Blount. 8th Baron Mountjoy

When Lord Mountjoy arrived in Ireland, charged with the task of ending the Nine Years' War, Christopher accompanied him on an expedition against the O'Mores of Laois. In October 1600 he fought at the Battle of Moyry Pass and was wounded. He was Mountjoy's right-hand man in central Ireland during the following months, although he later complained that his services were ill-rewarded. In August 1601 he was in Ulster; when the news came of the Spanish landing he was sent to intercept Hugh Roe O'Donnell, but failed in the attempt. At the Battle of Kinsale, which marked the climax of the Nine Years' War, he was entrusted with preventing the Irish and Spanish armies from joining, and was successful in his mission.

He is next heard of in Dublin, and then briefly became governor of Monaghan. On the submission of Hugh O'Neill to Lord Mountjoy, which brought the Nine Years' War to an end, his garrison was reduced. It appears that he was accused of treasonable correspondence with O'Neill, and wrote to Robert Cecil asking for leave to come to London to clear his name. He has quarrelled bitterly with his subordinate commander, Laurence Esmonde, 1st Baron Esmonde, and was accused, rightly or wrongly, of having illegally hanged an English servant. Complaints about his conduct led to his summary dismissal as Governor of Monaghan. He was still said to be troubled by the downfall of Essex, and also gravely embarrassed by the pro-Catholic activities of his father, who was now openly campaigning for the repeal of the Penal Laws.

Meeting with no response, either to his demands to be allowed to clear his name or to his request for a sign of royal favour, he decided to seek employment abroad, a decision no doubt made easier by the recent break-up of his marriage to Elizabeth Wentworth. The new Lord Deputy, Sir Arthur Chichester, was persuaded to plead on Christopher's behalf with Cecil, urging that he be given employment in Ireland, but nothing was done for him and he entered the service of Archduke Albert in the Spanish Netherlands. Chichester was concerned that other young nobles would follow his example, but in the event, his foreign service was cut short by his father's death in May 1607. He returned home from Brussels, to find that he had inherited an estate severely encumbered by debt.

== Flight of the Earls ==
In the chain of events which led to the Flight of the Earls in 1607, the new Lord Howth certainly played some part, though what precisely it was remains a mystery. Even before his return to Ireland, he was aware of a conspiracy involving Hugh O'Neill, Rory O'Donnell, 1st Earl of Tyrconnell, Randal MacDonnell, 1st Earl of Antrim, and Richard Nugent, 1st Earl of Westmeath. On a flying visit to England, he revealed part of the conspiracy to the Privy Council, who informed Chichester that he should examine an individual called A.B.

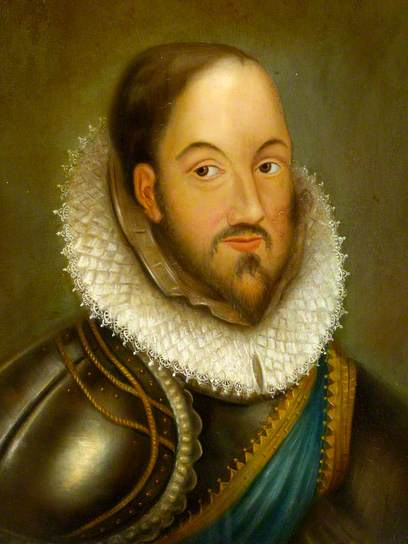
Sir Arthur Chichester: he had an extremely low opinion of Howth

On learning that A.B. was Howth himself, Chichester, who had by now developed a very low opinion of him, was inclined to regard his story as an invention, until the flight of Tyrone and Tyrconnell confirmed that at least a part of Howth's story was true. Since he was clearly involved in the plot to some extent, he was arrested and questioned further; Chichester called his replies "half-witted". His cousin George St Lawrence was prepared to testify that Christopher has been a prime mover in the plot: George was sentenced to death for treason for his own part in the conspiracy, but later received a royal pardon, causing his cousin, understandably, to fear for his own life. He was briefly imprisoned in Dublin and then sent to London. Howth, who for all his faults had considerable charm and eloquence, convinced the Privy Council of his innocence, and won the favour of King James I, although his persistent demands for a pension were rebuffed. He returned to Ireland in March 1608.

Howth's revelations had an influence on the outbreak of the 1608 O'Doherty's Rebellion by creating a sense of alarm about a major conspiracy amongst the Gaelic lords of Ulster. In this tense situation, an innocent wood-cutting expedition by Sir Cahir O'Doherty was mistaken for the beginning of a wider conspiracy by local authorities. O'Doherty's sense of persecution after this incident led him to rebel, and he burnt Derry to the ground.

== Feuds ==
At home in Ireland, Howth found his reputation in ruins: as he sadly wrote to the King, the favour which James showed him merely deepened his disgrace in the eyes of his neighbours, most of whom regarded him with deep suspicion. He claimed to be in fear of his life, and to be unable to trust even his few remaining friends.

Unwisely, he proceeded to quarrel with several other leading figures of the Pale. Sir Garret Moore, 1st Viscount Moore, was a connection of Howth by marriage and had previously been friendly with him; but Moore now turned against him, (the precise cause of the quarrel is unclear) calling him a coward, a braggart and a liar. Howth in turn accused Moore of plotting treason with Hugh O'Neill, and, bizarrely, of trying to raise the Devil. Although Moore had undoubtedly been friendly with O'Neill, Howth was quite unable to prove the charge of treason, while the charge of necromancy was simply laughed at. Chichester said that no one would condemn a horse-boy, let alone a knight, on such evidence. The case was transferred to England and Moore was cleared of all charges. Howth was however allowed to go to England, and again his personal charm won him the goodwill of James I, whose fondness for attractive young men was the subject of much gossip.

The feud between Howth and Moore soon extended to Moore's in-laws, Thomas Jones, Archbishop of Dublin and the Archbishop's son Lord Ranelagh. Ranelagh's description of Howth as "a brave man among cowards" provoked a violent affray in a tennis court at Thomas St. in Dublin in May 1609, in which a Mr. Barnewall was killed. Howth claimed that Barnewall, who was a cousin of his on his mother's side, was killed defending him: Ranelagh claimed that the dead man had intervened to restore order and was killed by Howth's men. Chichester, who happened to be nearby, heard of the affair: he took Jones's side and had Howth arrested at once. The inquest found a verdict of manslaughter: Howth, under examination by the Irish Council, claimed to be the victim of a conspiracy to murder him whose members included Chichester, Moore and the Jones family. The Council found that Howth had no basis whatsoever for his charges "only talk behind men's backs and loose observations", and that he was acting out of malice towards his fellow nobles. The Council ordered him, as a man who could not control his passions, to remain at home and mend his behaviour, "for his Majesty much disliked his proud carriage towards the supreme officials of the Kingdom". He was strictly forbidden to go to London, but did so. After a brief spell in the Fleet Prison, he obtained a royal audience and yet again gained the King's favour. Chichester was reprimanded for showing undue bias in the Howth-Moore feud, and thereafter made at least an outward show of friendship to Howth.

== Last years and death ==
Howth's later years were peaceful enough, apart from increasing money troubles. He sat in the Irish Parliament of 1613–5: he made some overtures to the Catholic opposition, but the Crown does not seem to have taken them seriously. His relations with Archbishop Jones improved and in 1614 they worked together to raise a free gift in Dublin for the King, Howth as a good example to his fellow nobles contributing £100. He married his eldest son into the powerful "New English" Montgomery family, no doubt hoping to benefit from the Plantation of Ulster, and also to alleviate his money troubles, as his new daughter-in-law was a wealthy heiress. He died on 24 October 1619, but for some reason was not buried until late January 1620.

== Family ==
His married life was unhappy although, unlike his grandfather the 8th Baron, who was notorious for domestic cruelty, he was never accused of ill-treating his wife. She was Elizabeth Wentworth, daughter of Sir John Wentworth of Little Horkesley and Gosfield Hall, Essex, and his first wife Elizabeth Heydon. She was a sister of John Wentworth, High Sheriff of Essex.

The marriage may well have been a love affair, although it was also advantageous to Howth, as the Wentworths were substantial landowners in Essex, and Elizabeth's brother John, though he did not play a leading role in politics, married a granddaughter of Edward Seymour, 1st Duke of Somerset, and left his son a "splendid inheritance". Possibly the breakdown of the marriage was due to a similarity of temperament, since Elizabeth was also quarrelsome, referring in her will to a long dispute with her elder son, for which she now graciously forgave him. The couple married about 1595 but had separated by 1605. Howth was ordered by the Privy Council to pay his wife £100 by way of alimony; the amount was later reduced but still placed a heavy financial burden on him, a cause of even more contention and ill-feeling between husband and wife. In 1614 he tried unsuccessfully to stop payment altogether. They had three children:

- Nicholas St Lawrence, 11th Baron Howth
- Thomas, who settled in Suffolk and married Elinor Lynne
- Margaret, who married firstly William FitzWilliam and secondly Michael Berford (or Birford).

His widow remarried Sir Robert Newcomen, first of the Newcomen baronets of Keenagh, County Longford, and died in 1627.

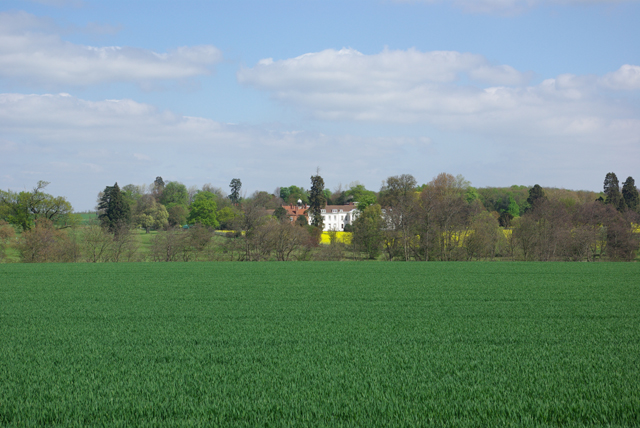
Gosfield Hall, the family home of Christopher's wife, Elizabeth Wentworth

== Character ==
Those who knew Christopher St Lawrence best, like Chichester and Moore, often judged him most harshly, describing him as foolish, treacherous, quarrelsome, violent and irresponsible. Clearly, he lacked the political skills of his father, who retained the respect of both his peers and the Crown throughout his career: arguably he inherited a strain of mental instability from his grandfather. On the other hand, Christopher's courage and military skill were never seriously disputed: and a man who gained the friendship of Elizabeth I, James I, Robert Cecil, Essex and Mountjoy cannot have entirely lacked good qualities.

Peerage of Ireland
Preceded by Nicholas St Lawrence	Baron Howth; 1607–1619	Succeeded by Nicholas St Lawrence
