= Jonesborough, County Armagh =

Village in County Armagh, Northern Ireland

Coordinates: 54.088612°N 6.371802°W

Jonesborough: Irish: Baile an Chláir
- Location within Northern Ireland
- Population: 273 (2001 census)
- Irish grid reference: J013158
  - Belfast: 46 miles (74 km)
  - Dublin: 51 mi (82 km)
- District: Newry, Mourne and Down
- County: County Armagh
- Country: Northern Ireland
- Sovereign state: United Kingdom
- Post town: NEWRY
- Postcode district: BT35
- Dialling code: 028
- UK Parliament: Newry and Armagh
- NI Assembly: Newry and Armagh

Jonesborough or Jonesboro (/ˈdʒoʊnzbərə/) is a small village and civil parish in the Ring of Gullion in County Armagh, Northern Ireland. It is about 5 miles (8 km) south of Newry and lies 1,000 yards (1 km) from the border with County Louth in the Republic of Ireland. The Catholic parish includes the neighbouring area of Dromintee and crosses the Irish border into Louth. It is well known for being the primary Irish black market.

== Places of interest ==
- Moyry Castle
- Kilnassagart Pillar Stone
- The Holy Stone

== History ==
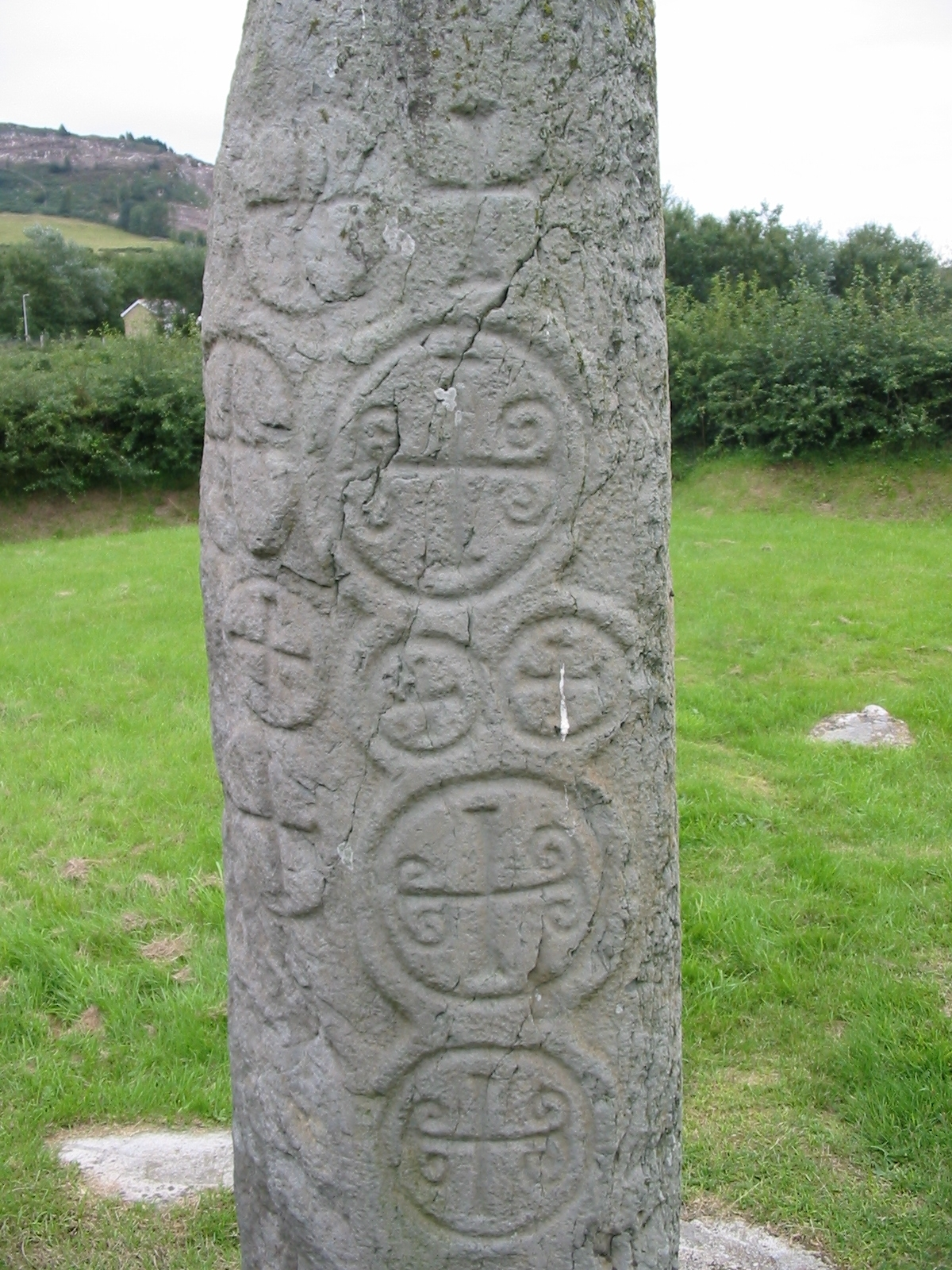
Kilnasaggart inscribed stone

Roth Jones founded the village in 1706. Jones was the landlord of the area in the early part of the 18th century. The village was previously known as Four Mile House.

=== Kilnasaggart Pillar Stone ===
Kilnasagart pillar stone

Kilnasaggart stone stands in a field not far from Kilnasaggart Bridge. It is a tall pillar stone, 2 metres (6.6 ft) high, and inscribed with some Ogham script, crosses, most within circles, and a Gaelic inscription. The pillar-stone is said to have originally been a pagan site for Druidical worship and sacrifice. It is also believed to commemorate an ancient warrior or boundary. Also at this spot there is an ancient graveyard believed to have belonged to the Druids. The Pillar Stone stands at the Northern edge of a double circle of graves, the outer ring of graves being larger in size than the inner ones, with the feet of the dead pointing towards the centre. The graves cannot be seen as they are completely covered in grass. At the base of the stone there are some small stones with crosses engraved on them.

One of these small stones has a peculiar shape to it and it is supposed to fit into the cavity on the top of the pillar stone. There is a legend attached to this stone. This whole area west of Slieve Gullion, including Dromintee, was known as Gleann-na-Samhaisce, "The Glen of the Heifer". It is said that there once was a famous cow in this glen who gave milk in abundance to everybody who came, always filling the bucket. However, a person attempted either through greed or malice, to milk her into a sieve. This angered the cow so much that she stamped her foot on this stone and then fled the valley forever. The shape of her hoof remains in this stone to this day.

The name Cill na Sagart means Church of the Priests and it is believed a monastery stood here, although there is no trace of it today. The original church was a 5th-century Patrician foundation originally called Domnach Culind (Gullion Church). The poet Eóchaid Rígéices is buried here according to the 11th century Laud Genealogies- Mac dond Óengus-sin Eocho Rígéices, qui hospitatus apud Daimíne & qui sepultus est i nDomnuch Cuilind ("Aengus had a son Eochaid, the royal poet, who visited Daimine Daim Argat and who is buried in the church at Slieve Gullion"). He was the first cousin and nephew of the Ulaid kings Muiredach Muinderg and Forga mac Dallán mheic Dubthach. According to local folklore, the monastery was knocked down so that the materials could be used to erect Moyre Castle. When the monks settled here they adopted the pagan pillar stone and inscribed it with the inscriptions of crosses, some with circles. Part of the older Ogham inscription, an ancient form of writing, was hammered off. The crosses were a sign of the triumph of Christianity and the inscription a re-dedication of the stone. This is in Gaelic with one or two words either in Gaelic or Latin. It reads "this place Ternoc son of Ciaran the Little, assigned it unto the keeping of (or in return for the protection of) the Apostle Peter".

Some say that this Ternoc, son of Ciaran the Little died in 714 or 716 and others say that he was Tighernach brother of Thomain, Archbishop of Armagh in 623. Both Ternoc and Thomain are believed to be buried near the stone. It does appear however, that Ternoc was a holy man and devoted himself and his possessions to the service of God. The inscribed date of Ternoc's death makes this stone one of the earliest dateable Christian monuments in Ireland.

=== Moyry Castle ===
Moyry Castle

Moyry Castle, is built on solid rock, It is almost square, 8 metres (26 ft) each way and is three stories high. There are musketry loopholes on each wall except the North facing wall. This wall held the fireplaces which protrude on the outside. From this time (1601) on this place became known as Ballinemoyree or "place of the moyre" and was called in Irish "Bother a Mhaighre". A captain Anthony Smith, was made constable of the castle and left to guard the pass with twelve men.

In the patent rolls in 1606 King James I set aside the following area for the maintenance and security of the castle, fort and ward of Moyry: the towns, Dromintee, Carrickbroad, Dromad, Faughilotra, Faughart Faughiletra, part of Feede. The man who ordered the castle to be built was called Lord Deputy Mountjoy, who replaced Lord Deputy Essex who was beheaded after signing a truce with the enemy, the O'Neills. Lord Mountjoy's real name was Charles Blout. He was 36 when he was sent to Ireland by Queen Elizabeth. He was a soldier, Courtier, Scholar, Bookman and was also deeply religious. He could also speak French and Italian.

It was Mountjoy's belief that "in every fort some little keepe (or tower) of stone be built, neither need these little castles be works of any great charge for they may be easily made such as this people will hardly force them". After this the Moyry pass was a relatively safe passage from North to South. In 1641 the confederates garrisoned the castle and in August–September 1690 King William's army, under the command of Schomberg marched from Belfast, through this pass to Dundalk on their way to the Boyne.

Lieut. Colonel Laurence Dempsey of Galmoy's regiment commanding 40 dragoons and Lieut. Colonel Fitzgerald of Bellew's regiment with a company of infantry ambushed a Williamite detachment at the stone bridge near Jonesborough on 23 June early in the morning, routing the Williamite infantry and taking prisoners. There were casualties on both sides, and Dempsey, a veteran of almost half a century of European warfare died of his wounds on the eve of the Battle of the Boyne at Oldbridge.

In one account of this journey this area is described as having vast mountains between which there is a great bog. Through the middle of this bog is a long road with a deep ditch and a small stone bridge. The road runs towards a place called the Four-mile house the present Half-way house. The bog is believed to be the Dun-a-ree bog which is now believed to be part of the railway embankment.

The most famous story of this area, is about a cat. Mountjoy left his warder and 12 men to garrison the Castle in 1601. Shortly after this, his warder shot a local man reputed to be a wizard, as a spy. The wizard's sole companion was an enormous black cat, who in revenge, destroyed the garrison. He slit the throats of the army's flocks and herds and carried them off. And so, for many a long day, the Cat of Moyry Castle was a terror to the soldiers of the pale.

=== Adavoyle railway station ===
The Ulster Dublin and Drogheda main line company opened a double track in 1850, which extended from Dundalk to a point north of Adavoyle station. This was a temporary station known as the "Wellington Inn" and was in use from 1850 to 1852 whilst a track was being cut through the curving rocks, now known as "the Wellington" possibly after the engineer responsible for feat. Until this length of line was ready a coach ran between the Inn and Portadown. Another station north of Dundalk was formerly known as Plaster but the name was then changed to Mountpleasant and Jonesborough. The section of line through the "Wellington" to goraghwood was opened in 1852, and going south through this, the steep gradient meant that goods trains laboured under their loads and even with a good head of steam they didn't exceed 15 m.p.h.

In 1907, Mr. Walsh, the stationmaster at Adavoyle was scalded by steam from a locomotive, and Mr. Fitzpatrick the gateman at Meigh was killed by a goods train at the Meigh level crossing in 1919. On 29 April 1921 at the 'top' of the station, bolts were loosened on the track and 9.30pm Belfast to Dublin goods halted; there is no record of any casualties. King George V opened the first Parliament in Northern Ireland in June that year, and the 10th Hussars who had attended that event returned by train on the 24th inst. There were three special trains, and the third one was attacked near Adavoyle. Four men died at scene, three soldiers, who were (Private Carl Horace Harper, 537772) (Private William Henry Telford) and (Sgt Charles Dowson) and the guard Frank Gallagher from Donegal who was stationed at Grosvenor Street Goods Depot. Two further soldiers died later and two Railway officials were seriously injured, they were Andrew Berkeley of the Traffic Department and the assistant Guard Dan Madden.

Forty horses died, some having to be shot because of their serious injuries. It was said that soldiers wept for their dead horses as they had been through the entire 1914-1918 war together. A massive grave was dug and the horses buried at the scene of the accident. There were four officers, one hundred and thirteen men and four horses on the train which was attacked, in all fifteen vehicles were destroyed. For many years there were reports of a ghost train travelling south; gatemen saw its lights but on opening the gates to let it through, no train appeared, it was possibly connected with the derailment of the train carrying the 10th Hussars and horses south to the Curragh. The event of the railway opened up an entirely new means of travel between Dublin and Belfast; from 1925 this entire line was known as the Great Northern railway or simply as the G.N.R. Adavoyle Railway Station.

=== Partition ===
Jonesborough, along with the rest of South Armagh, would have been transferred to the Irish Free State had the recommendations of the Irish Boundary Commission been enacted in 1925.

=== The Troubles ===
On 17 February 1978, a British Army Gazelle helicopter, went down near Jonesborough after being fired at by a Provisional IRA unit from the South Armagh Brigade. The IRA unit was involved in a gun battle with a Green Jackets' observation post deployed in the area, and the helicopter was sent in to support the ground troops. The helicopter crashed after the pilot lost control of the aircraft whilst evading ground fire. The incident resulted in the death of Lieutenant-Colonel Ian Douglas Corden-Lloyd.

On 20 March 1989, Robert Buchanan (55) and Harry Breen (51), both senior officers in the Royal Ulster Constabulary (RUC), were shot dead by the Provisional Irish Republican Army, while travelling in Buchanan's car, near Jonesborough.

== Governance ==
Jonesborough forms the Newry & Armagh constituency for elections to the Westminster Parliament . The Member of Parliament is Mickey Brady of Sinn Féin. He won the seat in the 2015 United Kingdom general election, retaining it in 2017 and 2019.

== Tourism ==
Jonesborough has become a popular destination for people living in the Republic of Ireland for purchasing consumer fireworks especially around Halloween as the sale of fireworks is strongly restricted in the Republic of Ireland.

== Sport ==
The first Gaelic Athletic Association club in County Armagh was briefly active in Dromintee in 1887. Jonesboro Border Rangers GFC was active from the 1920s to 1946, and the present club, Dromintee St Patrick's GAC (Cumann Naomh Pádraig), was formed in 1952. Gaelic football and camogie are played.

== See also ==
- List of villages in Northern Ireland
- List of civil parishes of County Armagh
