= Battle of Moyry Pass =

Battle during the Nine Years' War (1600)

Coordinates: 54.064°N 6.385°W

- Part of the Nine Years' War
| Date | 20 September – 9 October 1600 |
| Location | near Jonesborough, County Armagh |
| Result | Indecisive; English forces establish a garrison at Mountnorris but Mountjoy retreated in November |

Belligerents
| Irish Alliance | (Kingdom of England) England |

Commanders and leaders
| Hugh O'Neill | Lord Mountjoy |

Strength
| 3,000–4,000 | 4,000–5,000 |

Casualties and losses
| 1–200 killed | 4–500 killed, 400 wounded, several hundred dead from disease |

The Battle of Moyry Pass was fought during September and October 1600 in counties Armagh and Louth, in the north of Ireland, during the Nine Years' War. It was the first significant engagement of forces following the cessation of arms agreed in the previous year between the Irish leader Hugh O'Neill and the English Crown commander, the Earl of Essex.

The battle was fought by the armies of O'Neill and Lord Mountjoy, a follower of the late Earl of Essex. Mountjoy was determined to pierce O'Neill's heartland in central and western Ulster by the Moyry Pass. In the course of a two-week assault the English troops established a garrison near Armagh, taking heavy casualties, and Mountjoy retired with difficulty to Dundalk.

== Campaign ==
Mountjoy's strategy for putting down O'Neill's rebellion was gradually to constrict his territory in Ulster with a ring of fortified garrisons on the borders. To this end, he had landed seaborne forces at Derry in the north of the province and at Carrickfergus in the east of Ulster. In September 1600, Mountjoy moved north from Dublin and concentrated at Dundalk, in order to mount an expedition further into Ulster and re-establish a garrison at Armagh, which position had been evacuated by the English Crown forces after O'Neill's victory at the Battle of the Yellow Ford in 1598.

On 17 September 1600, Mountjoy set out from Dundalk, intending to march to Newry and then on to Armagh. The Moyry Pass (or "Gap of the North") was the sole point of entry to Ulster (much of the terrain being wooded and mountainous), and it had been well fortified by O'Neill with trenches and barricades. There were three lines of trenches, barricaded with earth and stone, and on the flanks the Irish had made further earth and stone works and 'plashed' (twisted) the branches of low-growing trees in order to provide cover for themselves and prevent the English occupying the heights on either side of the Pass.

== The battle ==
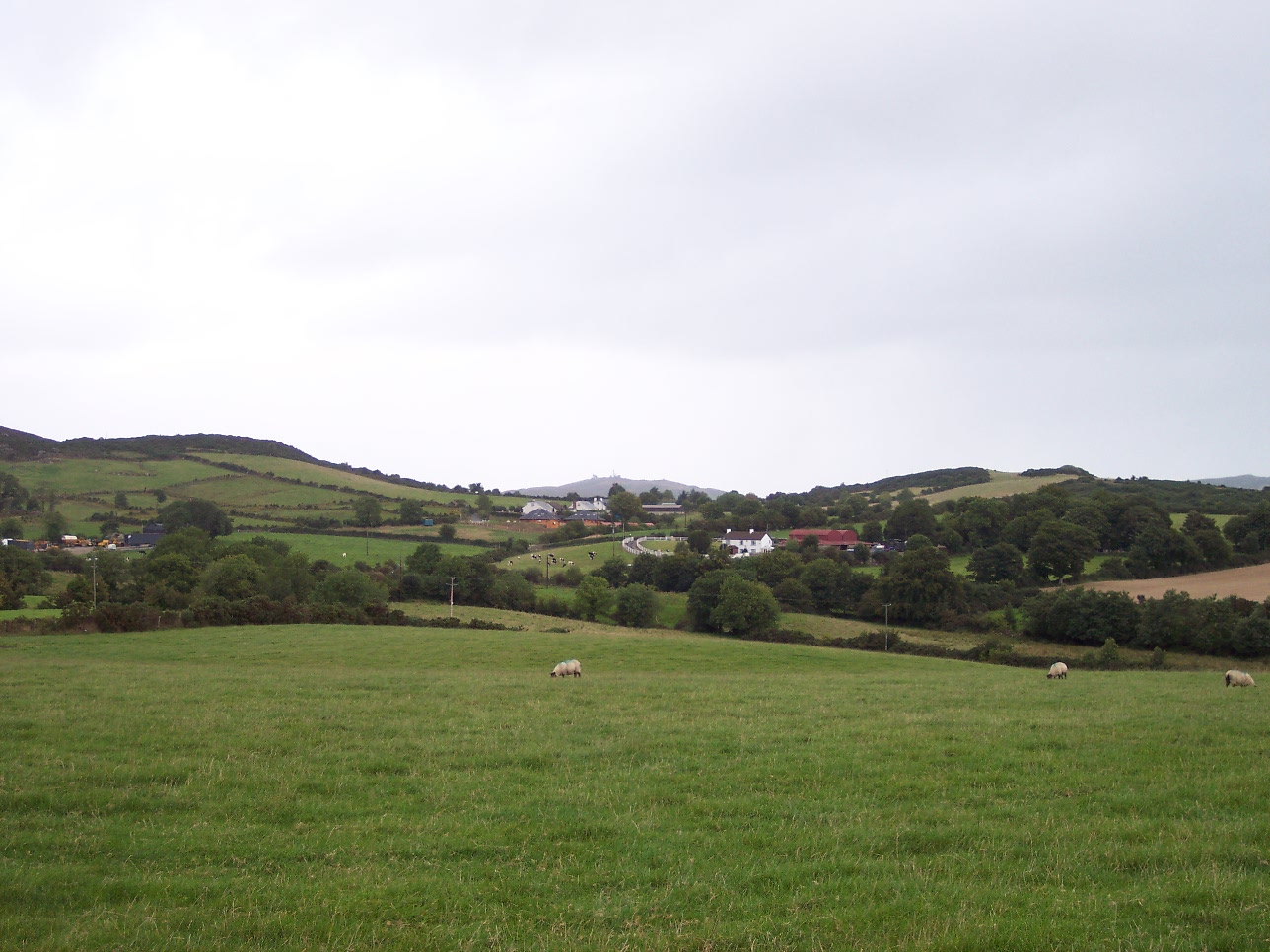
View of the entrance to the Moyry Pass looking north from Faughart Hill

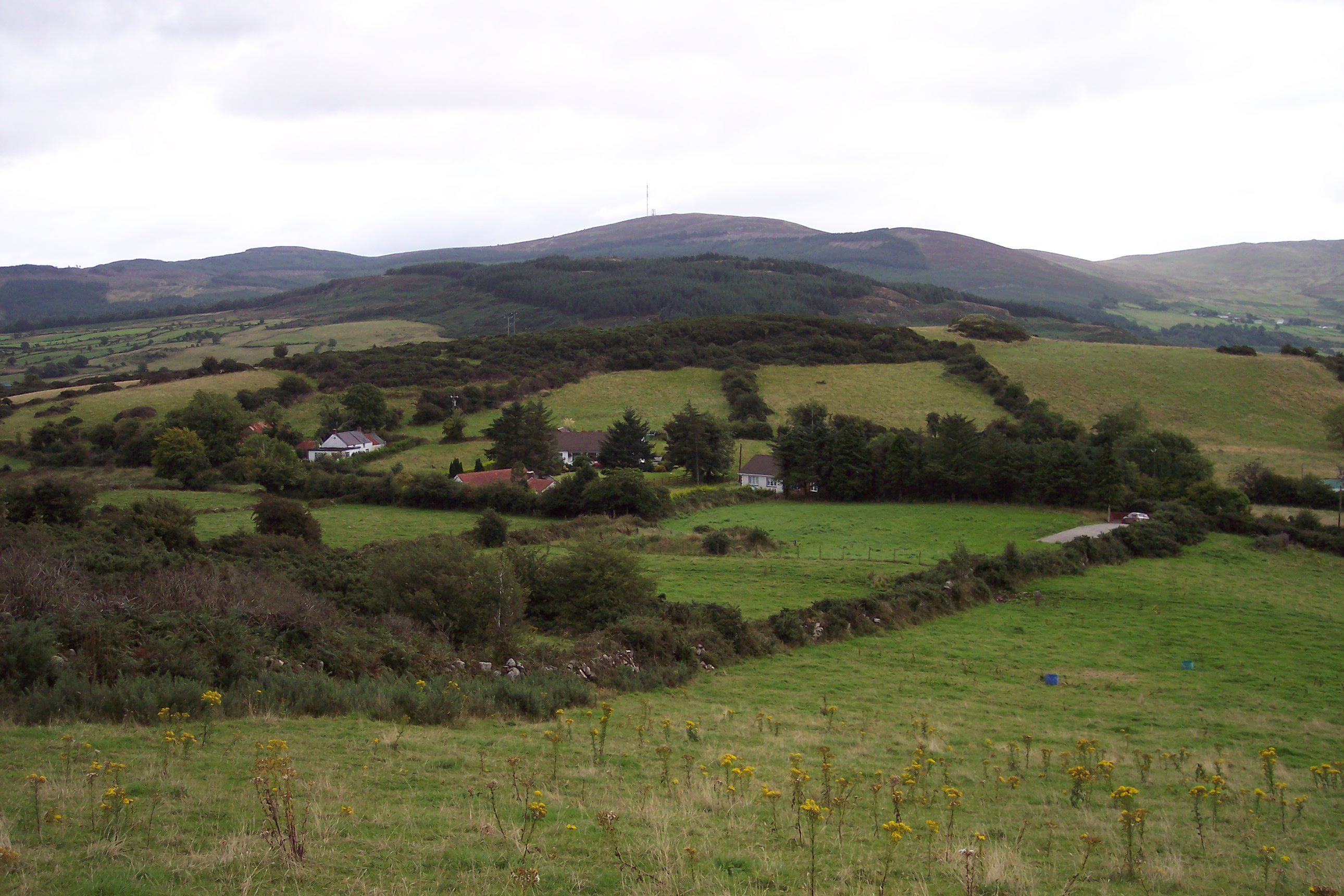
Site of O'Neill's defences in the Moyry Pass, running between Slievenabolea to Claret Rock

The English reached the pass on 20 September and set up camp just outside, to the south on Faughart Hill. Taking advantage of a misty day on the 25th, an officer named Thomas Williams (who had commanded the Blackwater Fort during the Battle of the Yellow Ford) made a sortie into the pass. After heavy fighting he identified the Irish defence works and returned to the English camp with 12 dead and 30 wounded. For six days heavy rain held up the fighting, until the weather cleared on 2 October. The weather was important because the matchlock muskets of the day would not work in wet conditions. On 2 October, Sir Samuel Bagnall led his regiment of infantry into the Pass at the head of four other regiments. The English breached the first barricade, and Thomas Bourke's regiment led the way to the second and third lines of defence. The English took the second line only to find themselves in a trap, with gunfire concentrated from three sides. They tried to dislodge the Irish from their remaining positions for three more hours before retreating, with the Irish in close pursuit. The English admitted 46 killed and 120 wounded, but it is thought that they understated their losses throughout the campaign.

On 5 October Mountjoy sent two regiments on a flanking march over the hill to the west, with one further regiment supported by horsemen advancing up the centre of the Pass. No significant gains were made and the regiments turned back, reporting casualties of 50 dead and 200 wounded.

By 9 October the privy councillor Geoffrey Fenton complained, "we are now but where we were in the beginning". Mountjoy retired to Dundalk - on either 8 or 9 October - but on the 14th word reached the English camp that O'Neill had abandoned the Pass and retreated to a crannog stronghold at Lough Lurcan. The most likely explanation for O'Neill's withdrawal from his position of strength is that he was short of ammunition and food and feared a flanking attack on his rear from Newry.

Mountjoy occupied the Moyry Pass on 17 October and dismantled O'Neill's earthworks. He marched on to Carrickban, just outside Newry, and by Sunday 2 November set up camp at Mountnorris (halfway between Newry and Armagh). There he built an earthwork fort and left a garrison of 400 men under the command of Captain Edward Blaney. He then marched back to Dundalk via Carlingford, but was attacked on 13 November by O'Neill, close to the Fathom Pass. Mountjoys men forced their way through and the Lord Deputy claimed the army lost 15–20 killed and 60–80 wounded, but a later report suggested the losses were much heavier, with 80 killed.

== Aftermath ==
The battle of Moyry Pass was a stalemate: Mountjoy could not take the Pass, O'Neill could not keep it. Mountjoy did establish a garrison at Mountnorris, but had to retire to Dundalk after taking substantial casualties. Mountjoy claimed his force lost only 200 men killed and 400 wounded in the fighting from 20 September to 13 November, though this may be a considerable underestimate. More, he said, died of disease. The Irish casualties were given by the English as an incredible 900–1200 killed and wounded, but this is questionable given that the Irish were in a strong defensive position of their own choosing, behind the protection of fieldworks. These figures probably say more about what Mountjoy wanted the Queen to hear than about the actual casualty figures. The following year Mountjoy built Moyry Castle to secure the pass.

== Sources ==
- G.A. HAyes McCoy, Irish Battles, Appletree Press, Belfast 1990.
- James O'Neill, 'Breaking the heart of Tyrone's rebellion? A reassessment of Mountjoy's first campaigns un Ulster, May–November 1600', in Duiche Neill: The Journal of the O'Neill Country Historical Society, vol. 24 (2017), pp 18–37.
- James O'Neill, The Nine Years War, 1593-1603: O'Neill, Mountjoy and the military revolution, Four Courts Press, Dublin, 2017.
- John McCavitt, The Flight of the Earls, Gill & MacMillan, Dublin 2002.
- Calendar State Papers Ireland, 1600.
