= James Phillott =

Archdeacon of Bath

James Phillott (20 February 1750 – 11 June 1815) was Archdeacon of Bath from 28 July 1798 until his death.

Phillott was educated at The Queen's College, Oxford, matriculating in 1766 and graduating B.A. in 1769. He held livings at Bath and Stanton Prior. He was a Prebendary of Wells from 1791 onwards.

His first wife Sarah King died in 1801, leaving three children, including Charles (died 1831), a prominent banker in Bath. He married secondly in 1808 Lady Frances St Lawrence, daughter of Thomas St Lawrence, 1st Earl of Howth and Isabella King. She died in 1842.

Jane Austen, who knew the couple, commented caustically on their marriage in a letter to her sister, suggesting that Phillott was only interested in Lady Frances's rank and title, while she, aged about forty-five, was desperate for a husband, and was prepared to settle for a widowed clergyman approaching sixty. Frances did not, it seems, gain much financially from the marriage: her husband left her only £200, the rest of his property being divided between his three children by his first wife.
