= John Leslie (cricketer, born 1814) =

Irish cricketer, barrister

Personal information
- Full name: John Leslie
- Born: 3 November 1814; Dromore, Ireland
- Died: 4 November 1897 (aged 83); Albury, Surrey, England
- Batting: Unknown

Domestic team information
- Years: Team
- 1836: Marylebone Cricket Club
- 1836: Oxford University

Career statistics
Competition	First-class
Matches	2
Runs scored	46
Batting average	15.33
100s/50s	–/–
Top score	28
Catches/stumpings	–/–
- Source: Cricinfo, 22 March 2020

John Leslie (3 November 1814 – 4 November 1897) was an Irish first-class cricketer and barrister.

A younger son of John Leslie senior, Bishop of Kilmore, Elphin and Ardagh and Isabella St. Lawrence he was born at Dromore in November 1814. He was educated in England at Harrow School, before matriculating at Christ Church, Oxford in 1833. While studying at Oxford, he played first-class cricket on two occasions in 1836. The first of these came for the Marylebone Cricket Club (MCC) against Oxford University at Oxford, while the second match came for Oxford University against the MCC at Lord's. A student of both King's Inns in Dublin and of Lincoln's Inn, he was called to the bar in 1840 and January 1841 respectively. He was latterly a member of the Middle Temple. Leslie died a day after his 83rd birthday in November 1897 at Albury, Surrey.
