= Emma Toke =

- Born: 9 August 1812; Holywood, County Down
- Died: 29 September 1878 (aged 66); Ryde, Isle of Wight
- Spouse: Nicholas Toke

Emma Toke (née Leslie; 9 August 1812 – 29 September 1878) was a British Anglican hymnwriter.

== Biography ==
Toke was born to the Irish bishop John Leslie and his wife Isabella St. Lawrence. She married Reverend Nicholas Toke in 1837.

In 1851, she started writing hymns at the request of a friend who was collecting for the Committee of the Society for Promoting Christian Knowledge. She contributed seven hymns to the hymn book. One hymn featured was "Thou Art Gone Up On High". She contributed a further series of hymns to the Sunday School Liturgy…and Hymn Book, Arranged by the Rev. R. Judd, B.A.
