= Christopher St Lawrence, 5th Baron Howth =

Anglo-Irish nobleman and statesman

Christopher St Lawrence, 5th Baron Howth (c.1485–1542) was an Irish nobleman and statesman of the Tudor era.

== Background ==
He was the eldest son of Nicholas St Lawrence, 4th Baron Howth and his first wife Jenet (or Genet) Plunkett, daughter of Christopher Plunkett, 2nd Baron Killeen and Elizabeth Welles. His date of birth is uncertain, but Elrington Ball states that he was already middle-aged when his father died in 1526: and since his eldest son was born in 1508, this suggests that he was born about 1485.

== Career ==
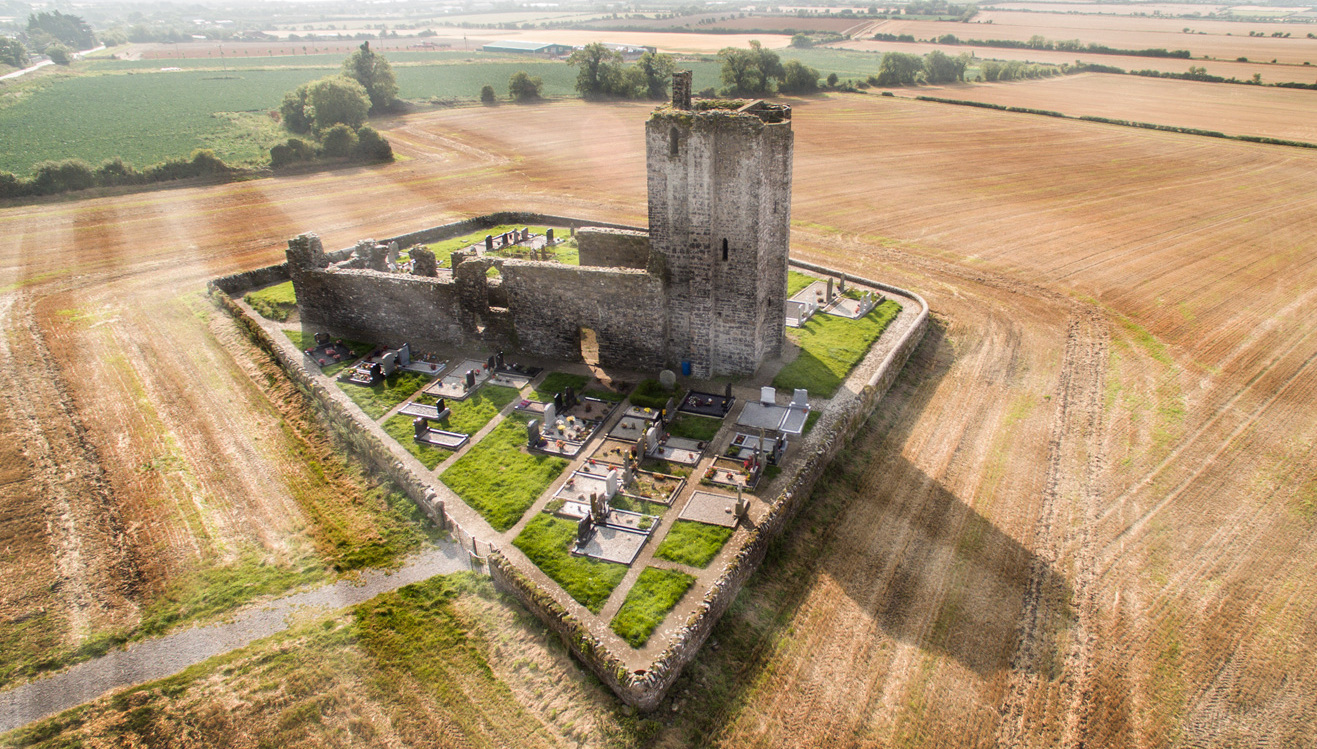
Baldongan Castle, which Lord Howth acquired through marriage into the Bermingham family

Prior to his father's death, he lived at Baldongan Castle, near Skerries, County Dublin, where his wife Anne Bermingham had inherited the Bermingham family estates; he was knighted and served as Sheriff of County Dublin. Soon after inheriting the title, he led an expedition against the O'Connors of Offaly, who had taken prisoner the acting Lord Deputy, Richard, 4th Baron Delvin, but the expedition was called off when Delvin was released.

In the Irish House of Lords he was a reliable supporter of the Crown, and he also served on the Privy Council of Ireland. He supported the religious reforms of Henry VIII but, unlike some of his peers, he apparently received no reward from the Dissolution of the Monasteries.

During the rebellion of Silken Thomas, Howth's influence and support for the Crown made him a principal target of the rebels: he was imprisoned and his lands were ransacked, although Howth Castle itself withstood an assault.

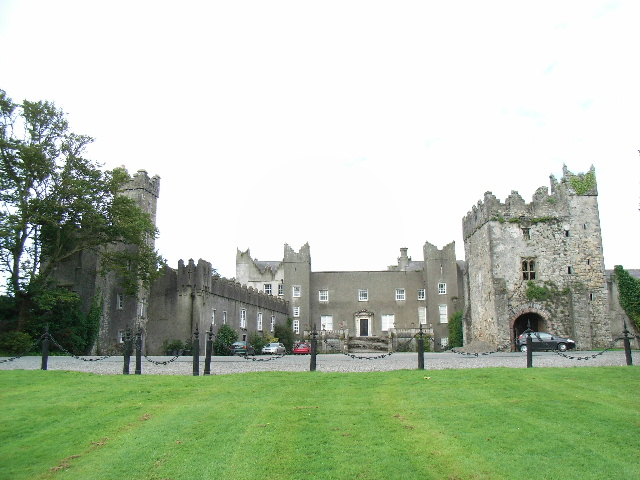
Howth Castle

He was on bad terms with the Lord Deputy of Ireland, Leonard Grey, 1st Viscount Grane, and was presumably one of those who worked to bring about Grey's disgrace, which led to his execution for treason in 1541. On the other hand, he was evidently on good terms with Thomas Cromwell; Ball argues that a letter to Cromwell in 1537 concerning a lawsuit between Howth and the Archbishop of Dublin suggests that Cromwell thought highly of him. Howth also sent Cromwell a gift of hawks. It is not known if his own career was affected by Cromwell's downfall and death in 1540; Howth himself died two years later.

== Family ==
He married, before 1508, Anne Bermingham: she was the daughter of his stepmother Anne Berford by her first husband. Anne inherited substantial estates at Baldongan from her brother. Three of their sons in turn inherited the barony. These were:

- Edward St Lawrence, 6th Baron Howth (1508–1549)
- Richard St Lawrence, 7th Baron Howth (died 1558)
- Christopher St Lawrence, 8th Baron Howth (d. 1589). Christopher was the ancestor of all the later Barons and Earls of Howth.

There was also a fourth son, John, and three daughters, Joan, Alison and Margaret, who all married into neighbouring gentry families.

== Reputation ==
Leonard Grey, the Lord Deputy of Ireland, in a famous gibe, described Lord Howth as someone who lacked both "wit and men". Ball however notes that Grey never spoke well of anyone, and the weight of evidence suggests that Howth played a considerable part in the government of Ireland in his time. Certainly, there is no doubt that he enjoyed the full confidence of Thomas Cromwell.

Peerage of Ireland
Preceded by Nicholas St Lawrence	Baron Howth; 1526–1542	Succeeded by Edward St Lawrence
