= Moyry Castle =

17th century castle in County Armagh, Northern Ireland

Coordinates: 54°04′13″N 6°23′7″W

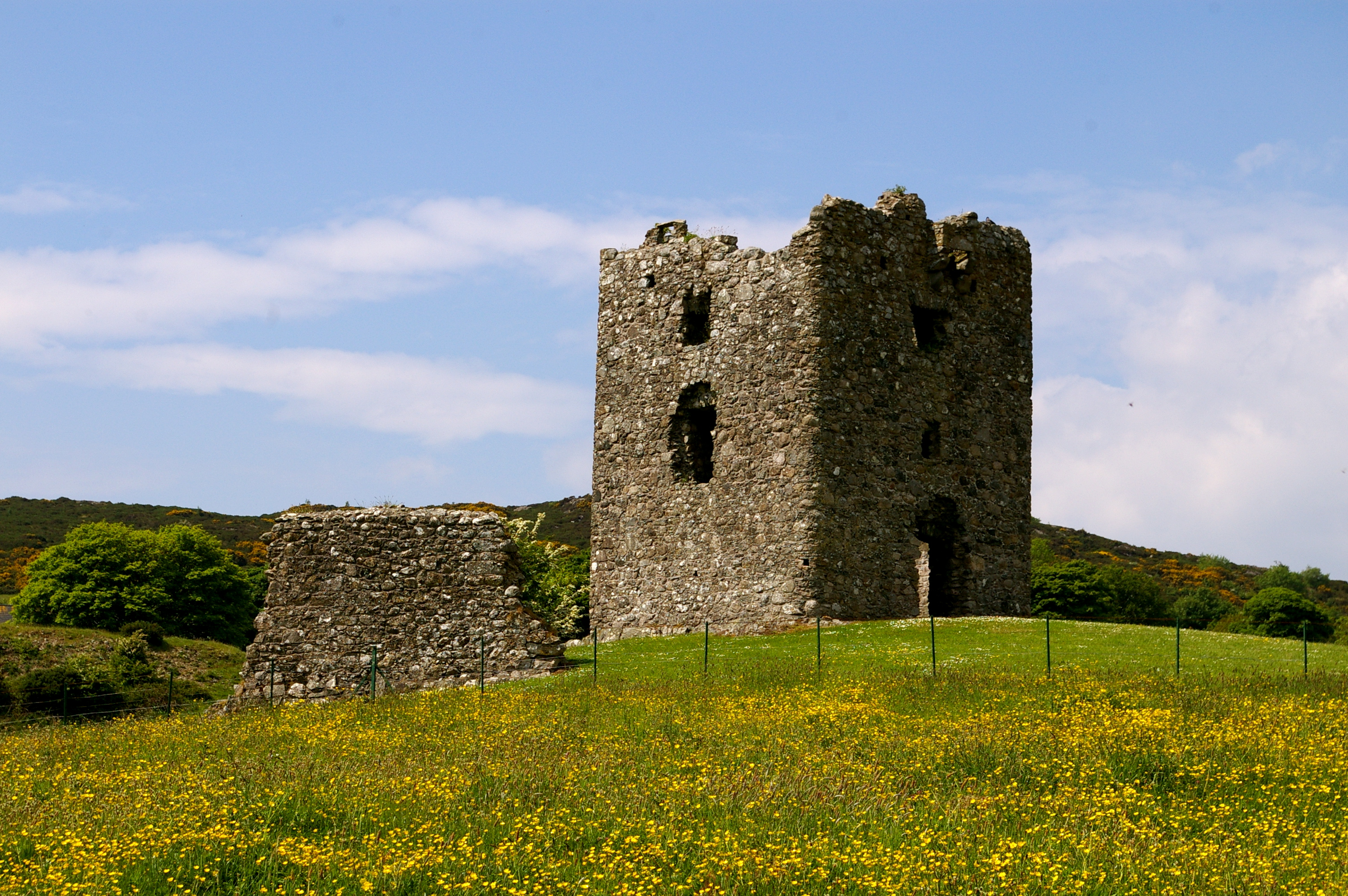
Moyry Castle

Moyry Castle (from the Irish Maġ Rí or "plain of the king") is a small 17th century castle in County Armagh, Northern Ireland. It was built during the latter stages of the Nine Years' War in June 1601 by Lord Mountjoy to help secure Moyry Pass and the Gap of the North. It is set in the corner of a small bawn and is a rectangular tower three storeys high.

Moyry Castle is a State Care Historic Monument sited in the townland of Carrickbroad, in Newry, Mourne and Down District Council area, at grid ref: J0576 1466. The castle is 7.5 miles (12 km) south of Newry town centre, and 5 miles (8 km) north of Dundalk town centre.

Moyry Castle, is built on solid rock, It is almost square, 8 metres (26 ft) each way and is three stories high. There are musketry loopholes on each wall except the North facing wall. This wall held the fireplaces which protrude on the outside.

== History ==
From 1601 on this place became known as Ballinemoyree, or Place of the Moyre, and was called "Bother a Mhaighre" in Irish. A captain Anthony Smith, was made constable of the castle and left to guard the pass with twelve men.

In the patent rolls in 1606 King James I set aside the following area for the maintenance and security of the castle, fort and ward of Moyry: the towns, Dromintee, Carrickbroad, Dromad, Faughilotra, Faughart Faughiletra, part of Feede. The man who ordered the castle to be built was called Lord Deputy Mountjoy, who replaced Lord Deputy Essex who was beheaded after signing a truce with the enemy, the O'Neills. Lord Mountjoy's real name was Charles Blout. He was 36 when he was sent to Ireland by Queen Elizabeth. He was a soldier, Courtier, Scholar, Bookman and was also deeply religious. He could also speak French and Italian.

It was Mountjoy's belief that "in every fort some little keepe (or tower) of stone be built, neither need these little castles be works of any great charge for they may be easily made such as this people will hardly force them". After this the Moyry pass was a relatively safe passage from North to South. In 1641 the confederates garrisoned the castle and in August–September 1690 King William's army, under the command of Schomberg marched from Belfast, through this pass to Dundalk on their way to the Boyne.

Lieut. Colonel Laurence Dempsey of Galmoy's commanding 40 dragoons and Lieut. Colonel Fitzgerald of Bellew's regiment with a company of infantry ambushed a Williamite detachment at the stone bridge near Jonesborough on 23 June early in the morning, routing the Williamite infantry and taking prisoners. There were casualties on both sides, and Dempsey, a veteran of almost half a century of European warfare died of his wounds on the eve of the Battle of the Boyne at Oldbridge.

In one account of this journey this area is described as having vast mountains between which there is a great bog. Through the middle of this bog is a long road with a deep ditch and a small stone bridge. The road runs towards a place called the Four-mile house the present Half-way house. The bog is believed to be the Dun-a-ree bog which is now believed to be part of the railway embankment.

The most famous story of this area, is about a cat. Mountjoy left his warder and 12 men to garrison the Castle in 1601. Shortly after this, his warder shot a local man reputed to be a wizard, as a spy. The wizards sole companion was an enormous black cat, who in revenge, destroyed the garrison. He slit the throats of the army's flocks and herds and carried them off. And so, for many a long day, the Cat of Moyry Castle was a terror to the soldiers of the pale.

== See also ==
- Jonesborough, County Armagh
- Castles in Northern Ireland
- Moyry Castle and The Gap of the North
