= Richard St Lawrence, 7th Baron Howth =

Anglo-Irish nobleman and military commander

Richard St Lawrence, 7th Baron Howth (c. 1510–1558) was an Irish nobleman and military commander of the Tudor era.

== Family ==
He was the second son of Christopher St Lawrence, 5th Baron Howth and his wife Anne Bermingham. He succeeded to the title in 1549 on the death of his brother Edward, 6th Baron Howth, who had married Alison FitzLyon, daughter of James FitzLyon, but had outlived his only son. Richard married Lady Catherine FitzGerald, daughter of Gerald FitzGerald, 9th Earl of Kildare by his second wife Elizabeth Grey, and widow of Jenico Preston, 3rd Viscount Gormanston, but they had no children.

== Career ==
Whereas his elder brother Edward is said to have left no mark on the history of his time, Richard was a political figure of considerable importance. He had some legal training, having entered Lincoln's Inn in 1541. He was a justice of the peace for Meath and Dublin, and sat on a Commission of oyer and terminer. He was also entrusted with the levying of subsidies. He enjoyed the confidence of the English Crown and was on good terms with successive Deputies, including Sir Edward Bellingham, Sir James Croft and Thomas Radclyffe, 3rd Earl of Sussex.

He is chiefly remembered as a soldier, and he played a leading role in all the military expeditions of his time. His most famous campaign was against the Scots at Lecale in present-day County Down in 1551. He defeated Shane O'Neill in an engagement in 1553, and saw further action in 1555. In 1556 Sussex sent him on another expedition against the Scots, whom he defeated at Glenarm in present-day County Antrim. In 1558 in the absence of the Lord Deputy of Ireland, he was appointed one of the guardians of the Pale, and was credited with maintaining firm order there.

He died in Drogheda in the autumn of 1558, and was succeeded in the title by his brother Christopher, 8th Baron Howth.

Peerage of Ireland
Preceded by Edward St Lawrence	Baron Howth; 1549–1558	Succeeded by Christopher St Lawrence
