= Thomas St Lawrence (bishop) =

Former bishop of Cork and Ross

Thomas St Lawrence was Bishop of Cork and Ross from 1807 and died in post on 10 February 1831. He had previously been Dean of Cork (1796 to 1807).

He was a younger son of Thomas St Lawrence, 1st Earl of Howth and his wife Isabella King, daughter of Sir Henry King, 3rd Baronet and Isabella Wingfield. The St Lawrences were among the oldest of the Anglo-Irish families, having been Lords of the peninsula of Howth in north County Dublin since 1177.

He married Frances Coghlan, daughter of the Rev Henry Coghlan and had seven children. All three of his sons followed him into the Church: none reached the rank of bishop, but Edward was Archdeacon of Ross.

Another clerical connection was his son-in-law John Leslie, first Bishop of Kilmore, Elphin and Ardagh, who married Thomas's daughter Isabella. Of the numerous children of John and Isabella, Charles was appointed to the same see as his father, but died a few months later.

== Notes ==
Church of Ireland titles
Preceded by Lord John Beresford	Bishop of Cork and Ross; 1807–1831	Succeeded by Samuel Kyle
