= Thomas St Lawrence, 13th Baron Howth =

Irish nobleman

Thomas St Lawrence

Parliament of Ireland
- In office 1692-?

Patriot Parliament
- In office 1689-?

Personal details
- Born: 1659
- Died: 1727 (aged 67–68)
- Spouse: Mary Barnewall
- Children: 9, including William
- Parent: William St Lawrence (father)

Thomas St Lawrence, 13th Baron Howth (1659–1727) was an Irish nobleman of the later Stuart and early Georgian era.

== Early life ==
He was born in 1659, eldest son of William St Lawrence, 12th Baron Howth, and Elizabeth Fitzwilliam. He was only twelve when his father died, and during his minority he was under the guardianship of Thomas Butler, 6th Earl of Ossory, who had been his father's close friend.

== Career ==
After the Revolution of 1688, Lord Howth seems to have been determined at all costs to back the winning side. At first, he supported James II, and sat in the Patriot Parliament of 1689, but after the failure of the Jacobite cause he quickly transferred his loyalty to William III, sitting in the Irish Parliament of 1692, and signing the Declaration of Loyalty to the person and government of the King in 1697. A family tradition that he entertained William in Howth Castle is probably unfounded.

Despite his political opportunism, he seems to have been highly esteemed by those who knew him. His closest friends, the Grattan family, were also close friends of Jonathan Swift (who later became friendly with Howth's eldest son and his wife). He built a quay to carry coal to Howth lighthouse, at considerable cost to himself. He was also noted for charity, and left a large sum in his will for the relief of the poor of the parish of Howth. Elrington Ball quotes an elegy on his death in 1727 which pays tribute to his virtues:

"Behold this stone whose vault contains

More precious dust than India's veins,

For honour's sake then shed a tear,

Since honour's self lies buried here."

== Family ==
He married Mary Barnewall, daughter of Henry, 2nd Viscount Barnewall of Kingsland and his second wife Lady Mary Nugent. They had nine children, of whom six reached adult life:

- William St Lawrence, 14th Baron Howth;
- Henry, who was killed in 1736 in a notorious duel with Hamilton Gorges, a brother of the 14th Baron's wife Lucy;
- Oliver;
- Mark;
- Nicholas;
- Elizabeth, who married firstly Edward Rice and secondly Dominick Quin, and by her first marriage had one daughter-
  - Mary, who married firstly Lieutenant-Colonel William Degge (died1741), and secondly the High Court judge Arthur Blennerhassett.

Peerage of Ireland
Preceded by William St Lawrence	Baron Howth; 1671–1727	Succeeded by William St Lawrence
