= William St Lawrence, 2nd Earl of Howth =

Irish peer (1752–1822)

The Right Honourable The Earl of Howth
- Born: 4 October 1752
- Died: 4 April 1822 (aged 69)
- Education: Trinity College, Dublin
- Spouse(s): Mary Bermingham (m. 1777; died 1793) Margaret Burke
- Children: 8, including Thomas
- Father: Thomas St Lawrence
- Relatives: Henry King (grandfather); Richard Boyle (grandson); William Boyle (grandson); Christopher St George (grandson)

William St Lawrence, 2nd Earl of Howth (4 October 1752 - 4 April 1822) was an Irish peer, styled Viscount St Lawrence from 1767 to 1801.

== Life ==
St Lawrence was the eldest son of Thomas St Lawrence, 1st Earl of Howth and Isabella King, daughter of Sir Henry King, 3rd Baronet and Isabella Wingfield. He was educated at Trinity College, Dublin.

He was Earl during the construction of Howth Harbour from 1807 as well as the visit of George IV to Ireland via Howth pier in 1821.

== Personal life ==
On 1 June 1777, he married Lady Mary Bermingham, daughter of Thomas Bermingham, 1st Earl of Louth and Margaret Daly. She died on 20 July 1793. They had four children:

- Lady Harriet St Lawrence (d. 1830), married Arthur French St George and had issue, including Christopher St George
- Lady Isabella St Lawrence (d. April 1827), married William Annesley, 3rd Earl Annesley in 1803, divorced 1820
- Lady Matilda St Lawrence (d. 20 April 1849), married Maj. William Burke, of Quansborough
- Lady Mary St Lawrence (28 December 1787 – 24 January 1825), married Clifford Trotter

He later married Margaret Burke daughter of William Burke and Margaret Coleman of Keelogues, County Galway. They had four children:

- Thomas St Lawrence, 3rd Earl of Howth (1803–1874)
- Hon. William St Lawrence (December 1806 – 22 April 1820)
- Lady Catherine St Lawrence, married Charles Boyle, Viscount Dungarvan in 1828 and had issue, including Richard Boyle, 9th Earl of Cork and William George Boyle
- Lady Elizabeth St Lawrence (21 September 1811 – 12 April 1863), married Sir Edward Richard Borough, 2nd Baronet in 1831

Peerage of Ireland
Preceded by Thomas St Lawrence	Earl of Howth; 1801–1822	Succeeded by Thomas St Lawrence
