= William St Lawrence, 12th Baron Howth =

Irish nobleman

William St Lawrence

Personal details
- Born: 1628 Colchester, Essex, England
- Died: June 1671 (aged 42–43)
- Spouse: Elizabeth St Lawrence
- Children: 5, including Thomas
- Parent: Nicholas St Lawrence (father)
- Relatives: George Montgomery (grandfather)

William St Lawrence, 12th Baron Howth (1628 – June 1671) was an Irish nobleman of the Restoration period. He was an intelligent and popular man who would undoubtedly have played an influential role in Irish politics had it not been for his premature death.

== Biography ==
Though some sources refer to him as the nephew of the previous Baron, the weight of evidence is that he was the only surviving son of Nicholas St Lawrence, 11th Baron Howth and Jane Montgomery, only daughter of George Montgomery, Bishop of Derry and his first wife Susan Steyning. He was born, probably in Colchester, Essex, in 1628. The St Lawrence family had inherited estates near Colchester from William's grandmother Elizabeth Wentworth of Gosfield Hall, which presumably explains why he was sent to Colchester Grammar School, where he enrolled in 1639.

His father died at the height of the English Civil War; as he was a staunch Royalist, his property had suffered considerably from attacks by the Parliamentary forces. William himself is said to have been left in peace after his father's death, despite serving briefly with the Royalist forces. In 1660 he used his political influence to support the Restoration of Charles II, and was recommended to the King by James Butler, 1st Duke of Ormonde as a military commander.

He was appointed Custos Rotulorum for Dublin in 1661, and sat in the Irish House of Lords on several committees, including the Committee for Grievances. In 1665 he is found acting in a judicial capacity at the general sessions in Kilmainham. He was also on good terms with Ormond's successor as Lord Lieutenant of Ireland, John Robartes, 1st Earl of Radnor, and entertained him at Howth Castle in 1669.

In 1671 he fell ill, and died in June. His last will, dated 14 May 1671, contains evidence of his wide circle of gifted friends including Thomas Butler, 6th Earl of Ossory (whom he appointed his children's guardian), John Keating, the future Lord Chief Justice of Ireland, and the leading physician Nicholas Henshaw. He was buried, by his own direction, in a new vault in St. Mary's Church, Howth.

== Personal life ==
He married his cousin Elizabeth St Lawrence, widow of Colonel Fitzwilliam. Their children were:

- Thomas St Lawrence, 13th Baron Howth
- Charles
- Mary, who married Henry Montgomery, 3rd Earl of Mount Alexander
- Sarah, who married Thomas Stepney
- Martha, who married Hugh O'Neill, who became a judge.

Peerage of Ireland
Preceded by Nicholas St Lawrence	Baron Howth; 1643–1671	Succeeded by Thomas St Lawrence
