= Nicholas St Lawrence, 11th Baron Howth =

Irish nobleman

Nicholas St Lawrence

Personal details
- Born: 1597
- Died: December 1643 (aged 45–46)
- Spouse: Jane Montgomery
- Children: 7, including William
- Parent: Christopher St Lawrence (father)

Nicholas St Lawrence, 11th Baron Howth (1597 – December 1643) was an Irish nobleman of the seventeenth century. The Lords of Howth for over a century had played a crucial role in Irish politics; but Nicholas, unlike many of his ancestors, preferred to lead a quiet domestic life. During the English Civil War, his loyalty to the English Crown led to the forfeiture of much of his property, and the troubles he endured during the conflict are said to have hastened his death.

== Early life ==
He was the elder son of Christopher St Lawrence, 10th Baron Howth (d. 1619) and Elizabeth Wentworth (d. 1627), daughter of Sir John Wentworth of Gosfield Hall, Essex and his first wife Elizabeth Heydon. His childhood is unlikely to have been happy, as his parents' marriage was notoriously troubled and they separated when he was still a small boy. Nicholas and his mother (who after his father's death remarried Sir Robert Newcomen, 1st Baronet, of a family which had settled in County Longford) were never close: in her last will she graciously forgave him for the "great grief" he had caused her over a lawsuit, the details of which have not survived.

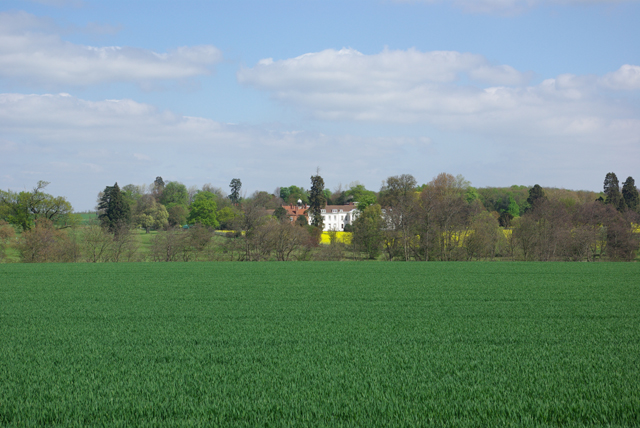
Gosfield Hall, the ancestral home of Lord Howth's mother, Elizabeth Wentworth

== Later life ==
He succeeded to the title at the age of 22, by which time he was a married man with several children, and by his own wish, he led "an uneventful and domestic life", although he did play some role in politics. In 1625 he announced his willingness to make a "free gift" to King Charles I, and served on a committee to raise a subsidy for the maintenance of troops.

In 1627 a fellow peer, Lord Dunboyne, killed his relative James Prendergast in a dispute over the inheritance of a barony. He was charged, not with murder, but the lesser crime of manslaughter. He claimed the privilege of peerage i.e. the right to be tried by his peers, and Lord Howth was one of the judges who sat to try the case. With only one dissenting vote they found him not guilty of manslaughter; Howth voted with the majority.

In 1629 Howth joined with his fellow nobles in protesting against the level of Irish taxation and in 1630 he petitioned the English Crown for the summoning of the Irish Parliament. When the Lord Lieutenant of Ireland, Thomas Wentworth, 1st Earl of Strafford summoned the Irish Parliament in 1634 Howth played a prominent part in its proceedings, sitting on two key committees.

He took his duties as Lord of the Peninsula and Port of Howth seriously, and was much occupied in trying to suppress piracy, an endemic problem in seventeenth-century Ireland. For this purpose the English Navy supplied him with a sixteen-gun ship, the Ninth Lyon's Whelp. The ship also served a secondary purpose, in escorting leading members of the Irish administration to and from Ireland. Its effectiveness in suppressing piracy was seriously limited, as the crew were notoriously quarrelsome and prone to mutiny. The Whelp was wrecked in the River Clyde in 1640.

Lyon's Whelp 1628- there were ten ships of that name in all, of which Lord Howth hired the Ninth Whelp to suppress piracy

== Civil war and death ==
On the outbreak of the Irish Rebellion of 1641, Howth joined with other leaders of the Pale in waiting on the Lords Justices to assure them of their loyalty to the Crown, and to complain of the defenceless state of Dublin. In the early part of the Civil War, the Irish Royalist leader, the Earl of Ormond, relied greatly on Lord Howth and regarded Howth Castle as his military headquarters: Lord Howth played a key role in transmitting Ormond's dispatches to England. As a result of his loyalty to the Crown, Howth's property suffered greatly: he was deprived of the substantial rents of his lands in counties Tyrone and Monaghan and he complained that his estate was "altogether wasted and burned". Under the strain his health seems to have given way and he died in December 1643.

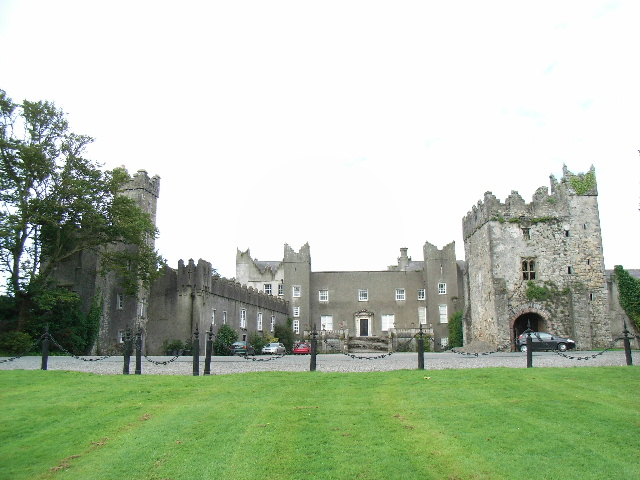
Howth Castle

== Family ==
When he was just 18, he married Jane Montgomery, only daughter of George Montgomery, Bishop of Derry and his first wife Susan Steyning, the eldest daughter of Philip Steyning (1509–1589) of Holnicote House, Somerset, and his wife Alice Fry (1533–1605). The marriage was not a love affair: Jane was a considerable heiress, while Howth's ancient lineage greatly impressed Jane's father, who described the St. Lawrences as "a noble house, the best of the Pale in Ireland". Nicholas's father on his side saw the marriage as a solution to his serious financial worries, and he was anxious to form an alliance with this powerful Ulster settler family, which, through the Bishop's second marriage to a sister of the Earl of Meath, was already linked to several recently ennobled "New English" families. The couple seem to have been happy enough, though Jane, like her mother, is said to have disliked living in Ireland. They had 7 children:

- Adam and Nicholas, who died young;
- William St Lawrence, 12th Baron Howth;
- Susanna (die 1664), who married a cousin, Michael St Lawrence, and had a son Richard;
- Frances, who married as his third wife her cousin, the noted military commander Sir James Montgomery of Grey Abbey, Rosemount, County Down; he was a son of Bishop Montgomery's elder brother Hugh Montgomery, 1st Viscount Montgomery;
- Elizabeth and Margaret, who died unmarried.

== Character ==
Elrington Ball describes the 11th Baron as a quiet, home-loving man, tolerant in religious matters and held in great esteem by his neighbours and relatives.

Peerage of Ireland
Preceded by Christopher St Lawrence	Baron Howth; 1619–1643	Succeeded by William St Lawrence
