= William St Lawrence, 14th Baron Howth =

Irish peer and politician

William St Lawrence

Member of the Privy Council of Ireland
- In office 1739-?

Member of Parliament for Ratoath
- In office 1716-1727

Personal details
- Born: 1688
- Died: 4 April 1748 (aged 59–60)
- Spouse: Lucy Gorges
- Children: 3, including Thomas
- Parent: Thomas St Lawrence (father)

William St Lawrence, 14th Baron Howth (1688 – 4 April 1748) was an Irish peer and politician, who enjoyed the friendship of Jonathan Swift.

== Early life ==
He was the eldest of the five sons of Thomas St Lawrence, 13th Baron Howth and his wife Mary Barnewall, daughter of Henry, 2nd Viscount Barnewall of Kingsland and his second wife Lady Mary Nugent. He lived for part of each year in Howth Castle, but also spent much of his time at Kilfane House near Thomastown, County Kilkenny, where he could indulge his passion for sport.

He sat in the Irish House of Commons as MP for Ratoath between 1716 and 1727. He was regarded as a man of shrewd political judgement, and became a member of the Privy Council of Ireland in 1739.

== Marriage and children ==
Shortly after succeeding to the title, he married Lucy Gorges, fourth daughter of General Richard Gorges of Kilbrew, County Meath, and his first wife Nichola Sophia Hamilton. Nichola was the daughter of Hugh Hamilton, 1st Viscount of Glenawly and his second wife Susanna Balfour, and widow of Sir Tristram Beresford, 3rd Baronet.

Lucy was more than twenty years her husband's junior, having been born shortly before her mother's death in 1713. They had two sons, Thomas St Lawrence, 1st Earl of Howth, and a younger son William (died 1749), who became a professional soldier; and one daughter Mary (1729-1787), who married Sir Richard Gethin, 4th Baronet, and was the mother of Sir Percy Gethin, 5th Baronet of the Gethin Baronets of Gethinsgrott, County Cork.

=== Jonathan Swift ===
His marriage to Lucy led to a friendship between Lord Howth and Jonathan Swift, who greatly admired Lucy, and called her "my blue-eyed nymph". Her stepmother Dorothy (Dolly) Stopford had also been Swift's friend. Swift became a regular visitor to Howth Castle, exchanged numerous letters with Lord Howth, and at Howth's request had his portrait painted by Francis Bindon. Swift's regard for Lady Howth led him to importune his friend Eaton Stannard, the Recorder of Dublin, to use whatever influence he had on behalf of her brother Mr Hamilton Gorges, who was standing for Parliament in 1734. Swift ruefully remarked that "I know of no other lady whose commands I would not have disobeyed on such an occasion", the more so since her brother was a complete stranger to him.

== Scandal ==
Scandal and tragedy visited the St Lawrence family in 1736. While the Howths were in residence at Kilfane, a cousin, Miss Barford and her friend Miss Hawley who were staying with them, were killed in a carriage accident. When news of the tragedy reached Dublin, it led in a rather obscure fashion to a violent quarrel between Lord Howth's brother, Henry St Lawrence, and Lady Howth's brother, Hamilton Gorges (for whom Jonathan Swift had canvassed for a seat in Parliament two years earlier). St Lawrence challenged Gorges to a duel in which Gorges killed him. Gorges was tried for murder but acquitted. The jury, as generally happened in such cases, accepted his plea that he had acted in self-defence.

== Character ==
Elrington Ball describes William as a man of considerable gifts, keen insight and a humorous disposition, but far too fond of his own pleasure. He was a keen sportsman and a heavy drinker. At the same time he took a strong interest in improving agriculture, and as his last will shows, was notably charitable to the poor.

== Death ==
He died on 4 April 1748 and was succeeded in the title by his elder son, Thomas, who was created 1st Earl of Howth in 1767. His widow remarried Nicholas Weldon of Gravelmount House, Navan, County Meath in 1751. Since Weldon was a Roman Catholic it was necessary under the Penal Lawsfor Lucy to obtain a royal pardon for the marriage in order to prevent forfeiture of her property rights, and this was duly granted in December 1751.

Peerage of Ireland
Preceded by Thomas St Lawrence	Baron Howth; 1727–1748	Succeeded by Thomas St Lawrence
