= Thomas St Lawrence, 1st Earl of Howth =

Irish peer and lawyer

The Right Honourable The Earl of Howth
- Born: 10 May 1730
- Died: 29 September 1801 (aged 71)
- Education: Trinity College, Dublin
- Spouse: Isabella Cosby (m. 1750)
- Children: 6, including Thomas
- Father: William St Lawrence

Thomas St Lawrence, 1st Earl of Howth (10 May 1730 – 29 September 1801) was an Irish peer and lawyer.

== Biography ==
Howth was the eldest son of William St Lawrence, 14th Baron Howth and Lucy Gorges, daughter of General Richard Gorges and his first wife Nichola Sophia Hamilton. He was educated at Trinity College, Dublin.

On 4 April 1748, he succeeded to his father's barony. In 1776, the Crown granted Howth a yearly pension of £500 in consideration of his own and his ancestors' services. He was a qualified barrister, and was elected as a Bencher of King's Inns in Dublin in 1767. On 3 September that same year he was created Earl of Howth and Viscount St Lawrence, both in the Peerage of Ireland. He was made a member of the Privy Council of Ireland in 1768.

He married Isabella King, daughter of Sir Henry King, 3rd Baronet and Isabella Wingfield, daughter of Edward Wingfield and sister of Richard, 1st Viscount Powerscourt, on 17 November 1750. Together they had six children. His eldest son Henry predeceased him, and he was succeeded by his second son, William. A younger son, Thomas, was Bishop of Cork and Ross 1807-1831: he had six children, but all his sons died without issue.

The Earl's eldest daughter, the third Isabella, married Dudley Cosby, 1st Baron Sydney, in 1773, but was widowed almost at once. She outlived him by more than 60 years. The youngest daughter, Frances, married as his second wife James Phillott, Archdeacon of Bath, a marriage which gave rise to caustic comments from Jane Austen about the desperation of Frances, who was well over forty, to find a husband of any description (Phillott being almost sixty at the time, and a widower). Frances died in 1842. The third daughter Elizabeth married the distinguished soldier General Sir Paulus Irving, Commander in Chief of the West Indies, and first of the Irving Baronets. She died in 1799, leaving issue.

Peerage of Ireland
New creation	Earl of Howth; 1767–1801	Succeeded by William St Lawrence
Preceded by William St Lawrence	Baron Howth; 1748–1801	Succeeded by William St Lawrence
