= Lawrence Dempsey =

Lawrence Dempsey (sometimes spelt Laurence Dempsey) was an Irish soldier of the seventeenth century.

Born to an Irish Catholic family, Dempsey took up a military career. As the Penal Laws in existence in Restoration Ireland made it very difficult for Catholics to serve in the Irish Army he instead joined the British Brigade serving in the Portuguese Restoration War between 1662 and 1668. He then transferred into the French Army, serving with Thomas Dongan's Irish Regiment which had been formed by Charles II to fight for his ally Louis XIV. He reached the rank of lieutenant colonel.

During the reign of James II, he was one of a group of experienced Irish Catholic officers given commands when the Irish Army was purged of its Protestant members by the new Lord Deputy of Ireland the Earl of Tyrconnell. Dempsey was appointed to command a cavalry regiment. He and his colleagues were given the task of professionalising the large number of new Catholic recruits, particularly during the Curragh camps of 1686 and 1687.

Dempsey served on the Jacobite side during the War of the Two Kings. He was fatally wounded during an engagement at the Moyry Pass on 22 June 1690 during the run-up to the Battle of the Boyne campaign. He was taken to Oldbridge where he died three days later. Although the fight had resulted in a victory for the Jacobites, it has been described as a pyrrhic victory because of the loss of the experienced Dempsey.

== Bibliography ==
- Childs, John. The Army, James II and the Glorious Revolution. Manchester University Press, 1980.
- Childs, John. The Williamite Wars in Ireland. Bloomsbury Publishing, 2007.
- McNally, Michael. Battle of the Boyne 1690: The Irish Campaign for the English Crown. Osprey Publishing, 2005.
