= Nicholas St Lawrence, 9th Baron Howth =

Anglo-Irish nobleman

Nicholas St. Lawrence, 9th Baron Howth (c.1550–1607) was a leading member of the Irish nobility in the late sixteenth and early seventeenth centuries. Despite openly professing his Roman Catholic faith, he enjoyed the trust of Elizabeth I and of successive Lord Deputies of Ireland, and was even forgiven by the English Crown for signing a petition protesting against the enforcement of the Penal Laws.

== Early life ==
He was the eldest surviving son of Christopher, 8th Baron Howth and his first wife Elizabeth Plunket, daughter of Sir John Plunket of Beaulieu House, County Louth and Anne Barnwell. His date of birth is often given as 1555, but was probably some years earlier: Elrington Ball states that he was well into middle age when his father died, and in 1605 he was described as being "too old to be likely to live long".

His early life was wretchedly unhappy, as his father was notorious for his cruelty to his wife and children. In 1577 Nicholas's teenage sister Jane died after, and probably as a result of, being severely beaten by their father, and his mother was so ill-treated that she fled from home in fear of her life. Nicholas and the other children, understandably, were said to live in fear of their father. The Court of Castle Chamber (the Irish equivalent of Star Chamber) granted Lady Howth a judicial separation. Lord Howth was fined for his cruelty to his wife and daughter and briefly imprisoned.

According to a well-known legend, Granuaile, in about 1575 the celebrated Pirate Queen of Galway, arrived unannounced at Howth Castle for dinner, only to find the gates barred; in retaliation for the discourtesy, she took the youthful heir to the barony hostage until the family apologised. Elrington Ball suggests that the story may be partly based on fact, but if the heir was a child at the relevant time the legend probably refers to Nicholas' eldest son Christopher, not to Nicholas himself.

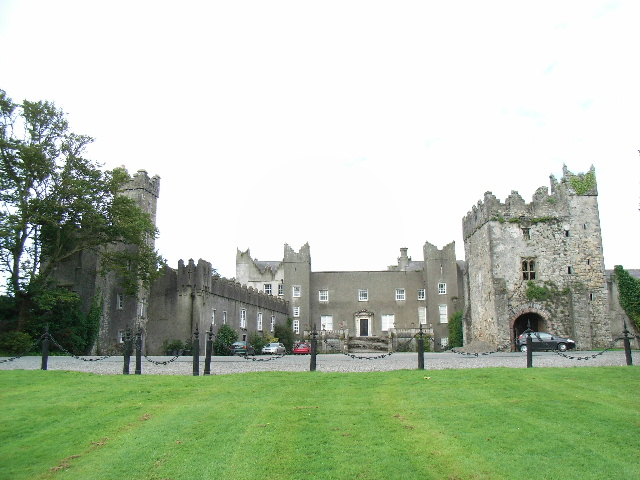
Howth Castle

In the 1580s, he lived at Platten in Meath, where his first wife Margaret had inherited property. He was knighted in 1588 and succeeded his father as baron the following year.

== Political career ==
In Elrington Ball's view, Lord Howth "was devoted to the interests of the Pale and did not always find it easy to reconcile that with the requirements of Government. " This was especially true after it became public knowledge that he practised the Roman Catholic faith.

His initial relations with the Lord Deputy of Ireland, Sir William FitzWilliam, were friendly enough, and he was appointed guardian of the Pale in the Deputy's absence. Shortly afterwards relations between the two men cooled when Nicholas became involved in the long and bitter feud between the Nugent and Dillon families family, headed by Christopher, Baron Delvin on the one hand and Sir Robert Dillon, the Chief Justice of the Irish Common Pleas on the other. The Nugent family pursued Dillon relentlessly with charges of corruption for several years until he was eventually cleared of any wrongdoing in 1593, and Lord Howth was closely associated with the attack. His motives are unclear; Lord Delvin claimed that Howth had been injured in some way by Lord Deputy FitzWilliam, but Howth himself proclaimed his trust in him. More likely he was influenced by his second wife's father, Sir Nicholas White, another bitter enemy of Dillon. This would explain Howth's loss of favour with the Crown since White's loyalty was deeply suspect, and he eventually died a prisoner in the Tower of London.

Howth was restored to favour and enjoyed friendly relations with the new Lord Deputy, Lord Russell, whom he entertained at Howth Castle on his arrival in Ireland. The following year he accompanied Russell on his campaign against the O'Byrnes of County Wicklow and the Lord Deputy wrote that Howth deserved some words of thanks from the Queen. In 1598 he was praised highly for being one of the few nobles of the Pale to render useful assistance to Sir Henry Bagenal in his campaign against Hugh O'Neill, although he later complained of the depredations of Bagenal's soldiers in the Pale.

In 1600 he was again the first of the leaders of the Pale to entertain a new Lord Deputy, Charles Blount, 8th Baron Mountjoy, who formed a very high opinion of him and appointed him to act as Deputy in his absence. In 1601 he went to London to discuss Irish affairs: the Queen, who had already met and been impressed by Howth's eldest son Christopher, also formed a high opinion of Howth himself. On his return he was appointed to the Privy Council of Ireland.

== Religious conflict ==
Howth's first wife Margaret was a daughter of Sir Christopher Barnewall of Turvey, who while outwardly conforming to the Church of Ireland, had privately adhered to the Roman Catholic faith. Christopher's son Patrick Barnewall emerged in the early 1600s as a spokesman for the Catholic nobility. Although the brothers-in-law had been on bad terms in the 1590s, when they were engaged in a lawsuit, Barnewall and Howth later became friendly and Howth, like Barnewall, openly professed his Catholic faith, as did Howth's son-in-law, Lord Gormanston. In December 1605 Howth and Barnewall were signatories to a petition that the Penal Laws should be modified, rather than extended. This was a risky step to take, particularly just after the discovery of the Gunpowder Plot, and Barnewall was sent to the Tower of London as a result, but Howth was left in peace. He enjoyed the confidence of yet another Deputy, Sir Arthur Chichester, who was said to openly dispute with him the rival merits of the two faiths (their friendship is rather surprising, in view of Chichester's hostility to Catholics, and his vigorous enforcement of the Penal Laws). Possibly to forestall any action against Howth, Chichester wrote that he was old and would probably not live long. This prediction proved to be correct: Howth died in May 1607 and was buried in Howth Abbey. To his heir, he left an estate heavily encumbered by debt.

== Family ==
By his first wife Margaret (died 1576), fifth daughter of Sir Christopher Barnewall of Turvey and his wife Marion Sherle, he had three children:

- Christopher St Lawrence, 10th Baron Howth
- Thomas, who served with the Spanish army in the Netherlands
- Mary, who married William Eustace of Castlemartin.

By his second wife Mary White, daughter of Sir Nicholas White, Master of the Rolls in Ireland and his second wife Miss Brereton of Kilcrow, County Meath, he had six further children:

- Richard
- Almeric
- Edward
- Margaret (died 1637), who married firstly Jenico Preston, 5th Viscount Gormanston and secondly Luke Plunkett, 1st Earl of Fingall
- Eleanor
- Alison, who married Thomas Luttrell of Luttrellstown (see below).

== Death ==
In 1607 he died at Howth Castle and was buried 21 May 1607 in Howth.

=== Alison Luttrell ===
His daughter Alison St Lawrence married, as his second wife, Thomas Luttrell of Luttrellstown Castle, MP for County Dublin in the Irish Parliament of 1613–15, in 1616. He was the grandson of Sir Thomas Luttrell, Lord Chief Justice of Ireland. Their daughter Mary married William FitzWilliam, 3rd Viscount FitzWilliam. They had five other children, including John and Thomas.

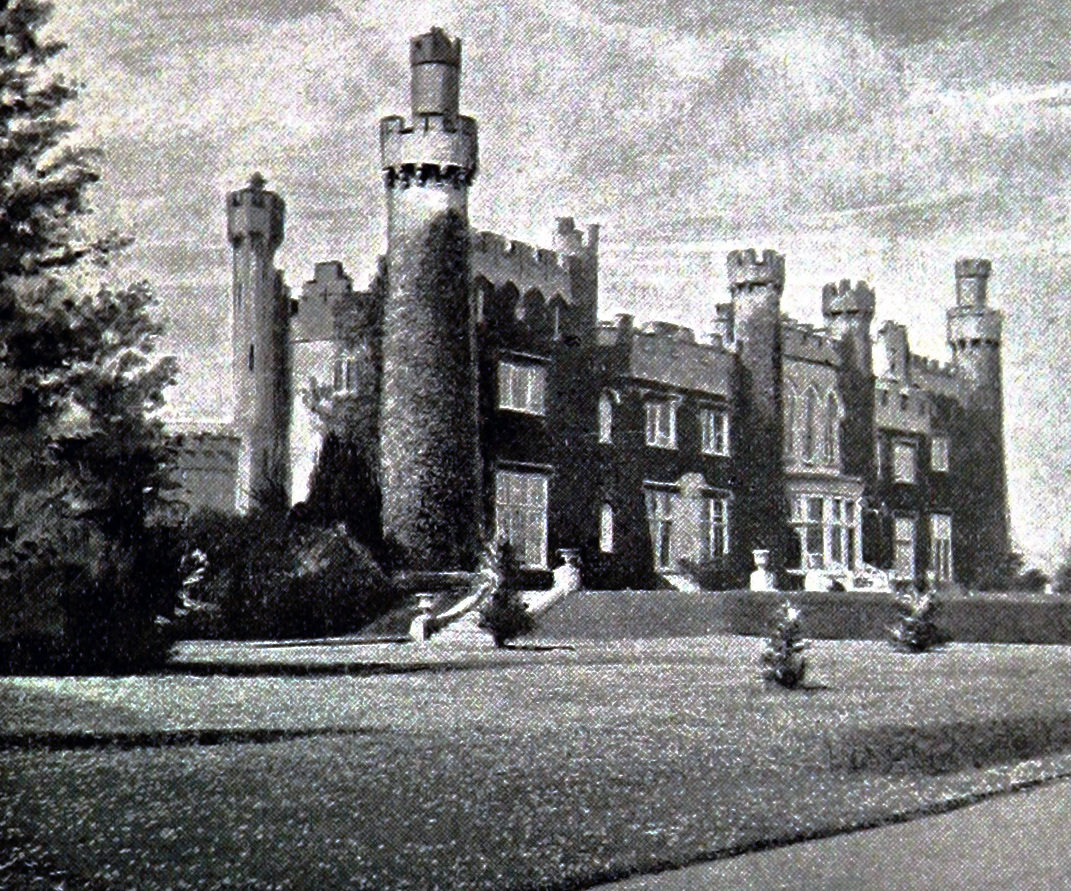
Luttrellstown Castle

Thomas Luttrell died in 1634; a copy of his will survives. He left Alison the dower house at Diswellstown in Castleknock, as well as twenty cattle, three hundred sheep, fifteen farm horses and four riding horses.

Peerage of Ireland
Preceded by Christopher St Lawrence	Baron Howth; 1589–1607	Succeeded by Christopher St Lawrence
