= Moyry Pass =

Coordinates: 54.069°N 6.379°W

- County Armagh, Northern Ireland

Site information
- Type: Mountain pass

Site history
- Built: Fortified in the late 16th century
- In use: 1600–1601 (notably during the Nine Years' War)
- Battles/wars: Battle of Moyry Pass

The Moyry Pass is a geographical feature on the border between the Republic of Ireland and Northern Ireland. It is a mountain pass running along Slieve Gullion between Newry and Dundalk. It is also known as the Gap of the North.

The pass was of historical military importance as it controlled the route between Ulster and The Pale around Dublin. Moyry Castle was constructed to guard the pass. A number of battles have been fought in or around the pass, including the Battle of Moyry Pass in 1600 and several engagements during the Williamite War in Ireland.

== Bibliography ==
- Peter, Spring. Great Walls and Linear Barriers. Pen and Sword, 2015.
