= Attorney General Lawrence =

Attorney General Lawrence may refer to:

- Allan Lawrence (politician) (1925–2008), Attorney General of Ontario
- James Lawrence (Ohio politician) (1851–1914), Attorney General of Ohio
- Nathaniel Lawrence (1761–1797), Attorney General of New York

== See also ==
- Thomas St. Lawrence (judge) (died 1553), Attorney General for Ireland
- Walter St. Lawrence (died 1504), Attorney General for Ireland
