= Earl of Howth =

Title in the peerage of Ireland, extinct 1909

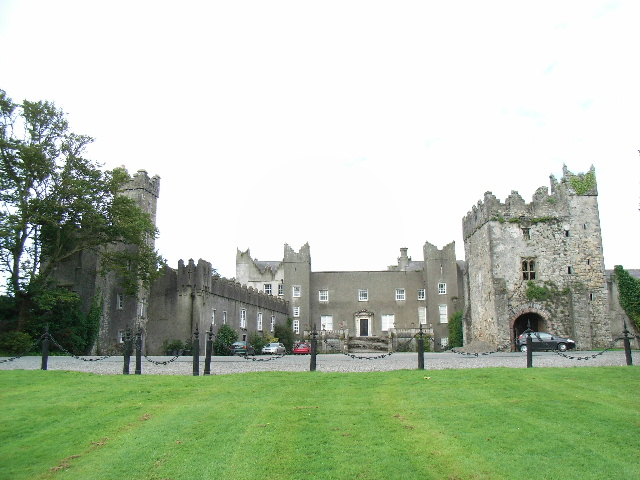
Howth Castle, the seat of the St Lawrence family

Earl of Howth (/ˈhoʊθ/ HOHTH) was a title in the Peerage of Ireland. It was created in 1767 for Thomas St Lawrence, 15th Baron Howth, who was elevated to Viscount St Lawrence at the same time, also in the Peerage of Ireland. The St Lawrence family descended from Christopher St Lawrence who was elevated to the Peerage of Ireland as Baron Howth in about 1425. The third and fourth Barons both served as Lord Chancellor of Ireland. The family's origins are thought to go back to Almeric Tristram, a liegeman of the Anglo-Irish knight John de Courcy, who conquered Howth in 1177. The St Lawrence family claimed significant prerogative rights as Lords of Howth over the whole peninsula, and were prepared to maintain their rights even against the English Crown.

The fourth baron was Lord Chancellor of Ireland, and a distinguished soldier who fought at the Battle of Knockdoe; his grandson, the seventh baron, was also a notable soldier. The eighth baron, commonly known as "the blind lord", was one of the leading Irish statesmen of his time, and led the opposition to the Government's taxation policy in the 1570s. His son, the ninth baron, was an open Roman Catholic, and led the opposition to the Penal Laws in the early 17th century. The tenth baron was a notable military commander who served in the Nine Years War with the Earl of Essex and Lord Mountjoy. The fourteenth Baron represented Ratoath in the Irish House of Commons, and was a friend of Jonathan Swift. The third Earl served as Lord-Lieutenant of Dublin.

The fourth Earl sat as Member of Parliament for Galway Borough, and in 1881 he was created Baron Howth, of Howth in the County of Dublin, in the Peerage of the United Kingdom. All these titles became extinct upon his death in 1909 as he left no male heir.

The family seat, Howth Castle, remained in the hands of their descendants in the female line, the Gaisford-St Lawrence family, until the twenty-first century.

== Lords of Howth ==
- Almeric (1177-??)
- Nicholas (1187)
- Almeric (1200)
- Henry (1250)
- Nicholas (1270)
- Adam (1290–1325)
- Adam (1325–1334)
- Nicholas (1334–1404)
- Stephen [or Christopher] (1404–35)

== Barons Howth (c. 1425) ==
- Christopher [or Stephen] St Lawrence, 1st Baron Howth (died 1430 or 1435)
- Christopher St Lawrence, 2nd Baron Howth (died 1462 or 1465)
- Robert St Lawrence, 3rd Baron Howth (died c.1485)
- Nicholas St Lawrence, 4th Baron Howth (died 1526)
- Christopher St Lawrence, 5th Baron Howth (died 1542)
- Edward St Lawrence, 6th Baron Howth (1508–1549)
- Richard St Lawrence, 7th Baron Howth (died 1558)
- Christopher St Lawrence, 8th Baron Howth (died 1589)
- Nicholas St Lawrence, 9th Baron Howth (1555–1606)
- Christopher St Lawrence, 10th Baron Howth (died 1619)
- Nicholas St Lawrence, 11th Baron Howth (1597–1643)
- William St Lawrence, 12th Baron Howth (died 1671)
- Thomas St Lawrence, 13th Baron Howth (1659–1727)
- William St Lawrence, 14th Baron Howth (1688–1748)
- Thomas St Lawrence, 15th Baron Howth (1730–1801; created Earl of Howth in 1767)

== Earls of Howth (1767) ==
- Thomas St Lawrence, 1st Earl of Howth (1730–1801)
- William St Lawrence, 2nd Earl of Howth (1752–1822)
- Thomas St Lawrence, 3rd Earl of Howth (1803–1874)
- William Ulick Tristram St Lawrence, 4th Earl of Howth (1827–1909)
